= History of Indonesia =

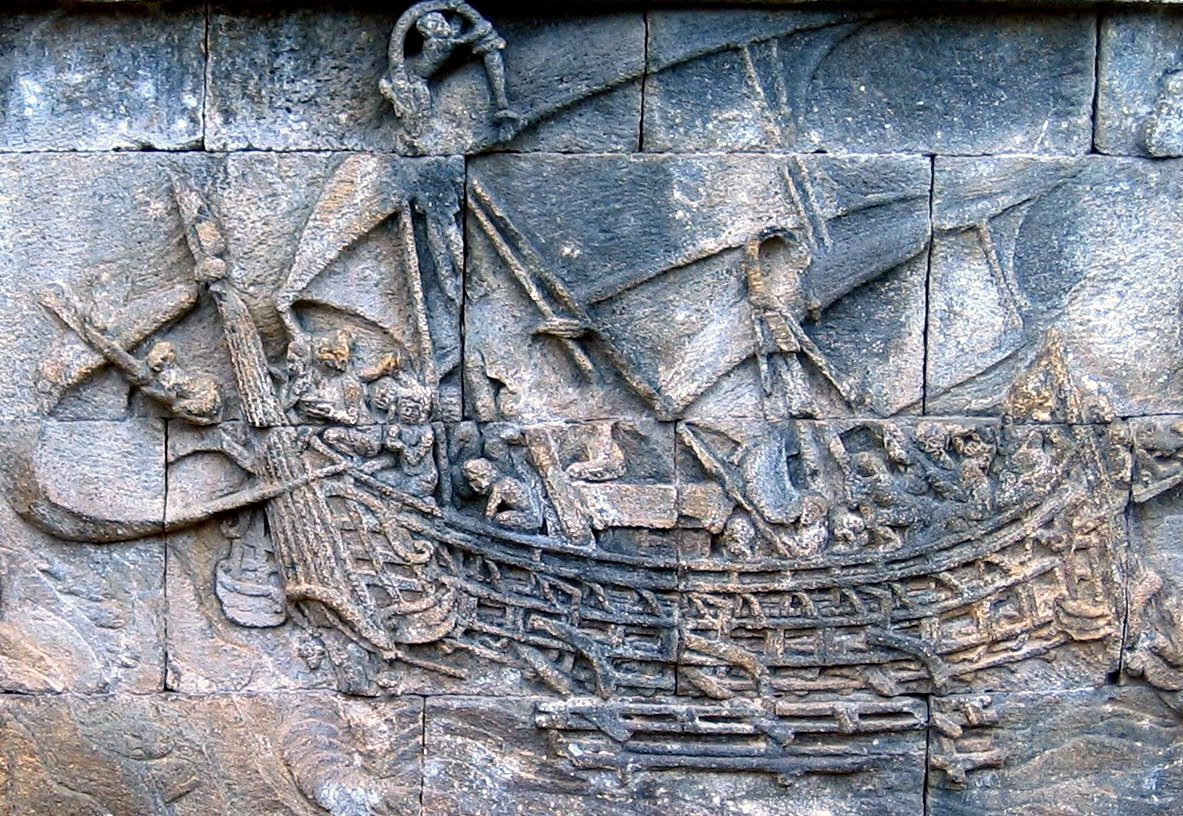
As early as the 1st century CE Indonesian vessels made trade voyages as far as Africa. Picture: a ship carved on Borobudur, c. 800 CE.

The history of Indonesia has been shaped by its geographic position, natural resources, a series of human migrations and contacts, wars and conquests, as well as by trade, economics and politics. Indonesia is an archipelagic country of more than 17,000 islands stretching along the equator in Southeast Asia and Oceania. The country's strategic sea-lane position fostered inter-island and international trade; trade has since fundamentally shaped Indonesian history. The area of Indonesia is populated by peoples of various migrations, creating a diversity of cultures, ethnicities, and languages. The archipelago's landforms and climate significantly influenced agriculture and trade, and the formation of states. The boundaries of the state of Indonesia match the 20th-century borders of the Dutch East Indies.

Fossilised remains of Homo erectus, popularly known as "Java Man", and their tools suggest the Indonesian archipelago was inhabited at least 1.5 million years ago. Austronesian people, who form the majority of the modern population, are thought to have originally been from Taiwan and arrived in Indonesia around 2000 BCE. From the 7th century CE, the powerful Srivijaya naval kingdom flourished, bringing Hindu and Buddhist influences with it. The agricultural Buddhist Sailendra and Hindu Mataram dynasties subsequently thrived in inland Java. The last significant non-Muslim kingdom, the Hindu Majapahit kingdom, flourished from the late 13th century, and its influence stretched over much of Indonesia. The earliest evidence of Islamised populations in Indonesia dates to the 13th century in northern Sumatra; other Indonesian areas gradually adopted Islam, which became the dominant religion in Java and Sumatra by the end of the 16th century. Europeans such as the Portuguese arrived in Indonesia from the 16th century seeking to monopolise the sources of valuable nutmeg, cloves, and cubeb pepper in Maluku. In 1602, the Dutch established the Dutch East India Company (Verenigde Oostindische Compagnie or VOC) and became the dominant European power by 1610. Following bankruptcy, the VOC was formally dissolved in 1800, and the government of the Netherlands established the Dutch East Indies under government control. By the early 20th century, Dutch dominance extended to the current boundaries. The Japanese invasion and occupation in 1942–1945 during WWII ended Dutch rule, and encouraged the previously suppressed Indonesian independence movement. Two days after the surrender of Japan in August 1945, nationalist leader Sukarno declared independence and became president. The Netherlands tried to reestablish its rule, but a bitter armed and diplomatic struggle ended in December 1949, when in the face of international pressure the Dutch formally recognised Indonesian independence.

An attempted coup in 1965 led to a violent army-led anti-communist purge in which over half a million people were killed. General Suharto politically outmanoeuvred President Sukarno, and became president in March 1968. His New Order administration was marked by widespread corruption, nepotism, human rights abuses, and the centralization of power, with political dissent brutally suppressed and the media tightly controlled. Economic policies disproportionately benefited elites, while poverty and inequality persisted for much of his rule. In the late 1990s, Indonesia was the country hardest hit by the East Asian financial crisis, which led to popular protests and Suharto's resignation on 21 May 1998. The Reformasi era following Suharto's resignation has led to a strengthening of democratic processes, including a regional autonomy program, the secession of East Timor, and the first direct presidential election in 2004. Political instability, social unrest, corruption, natural disasters, and terrorism remained problems in the 2000s, but the economy has performed strongly since 2007. Although relations between different religious and ethnic groups are largely harmonious, acute sectarian discontent and violence remain problems in some areas.

== Prehistory ==
=== First Hominins ===
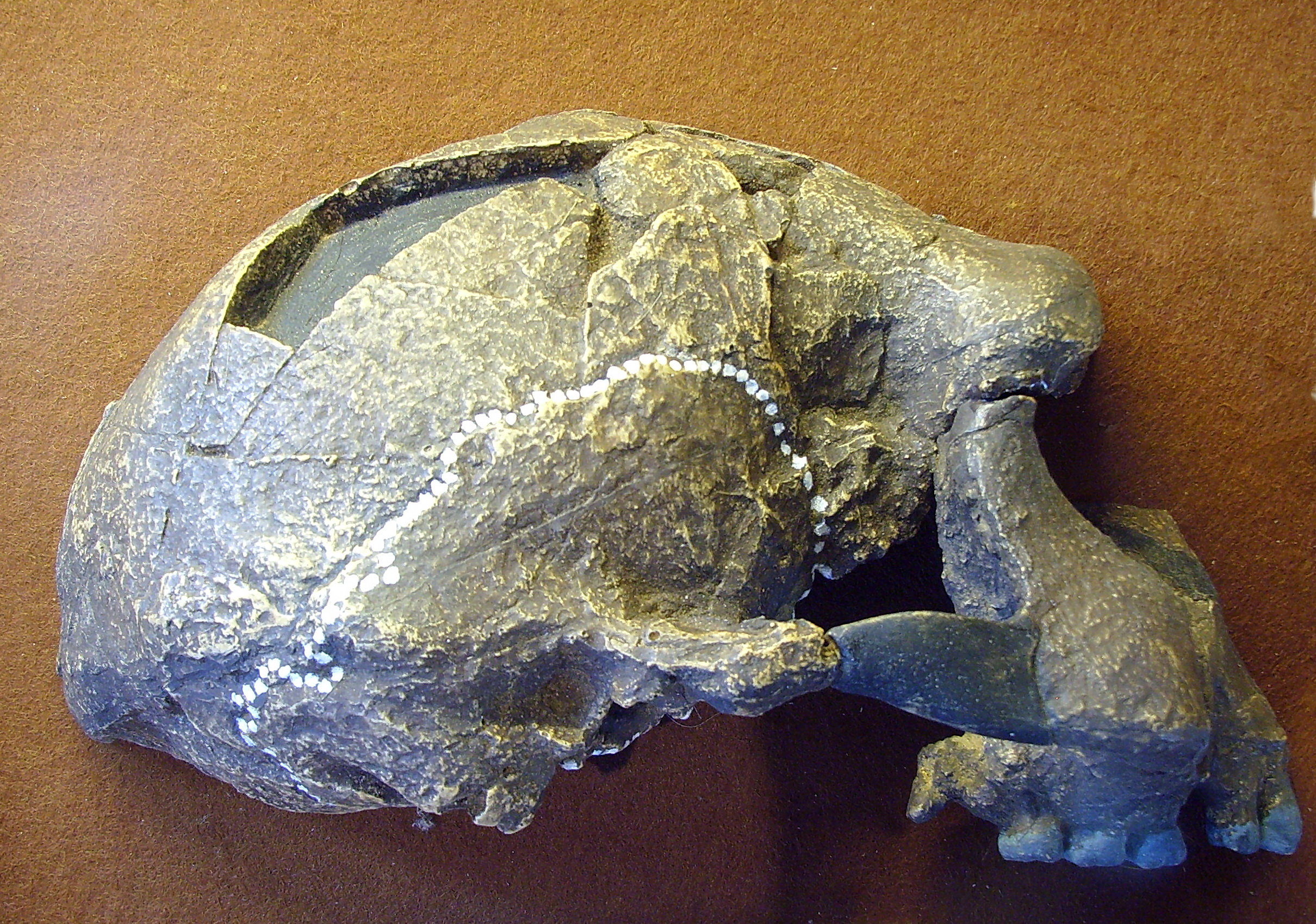
The replica of Java Man skull, originally discovered in Sangiran, Central Java

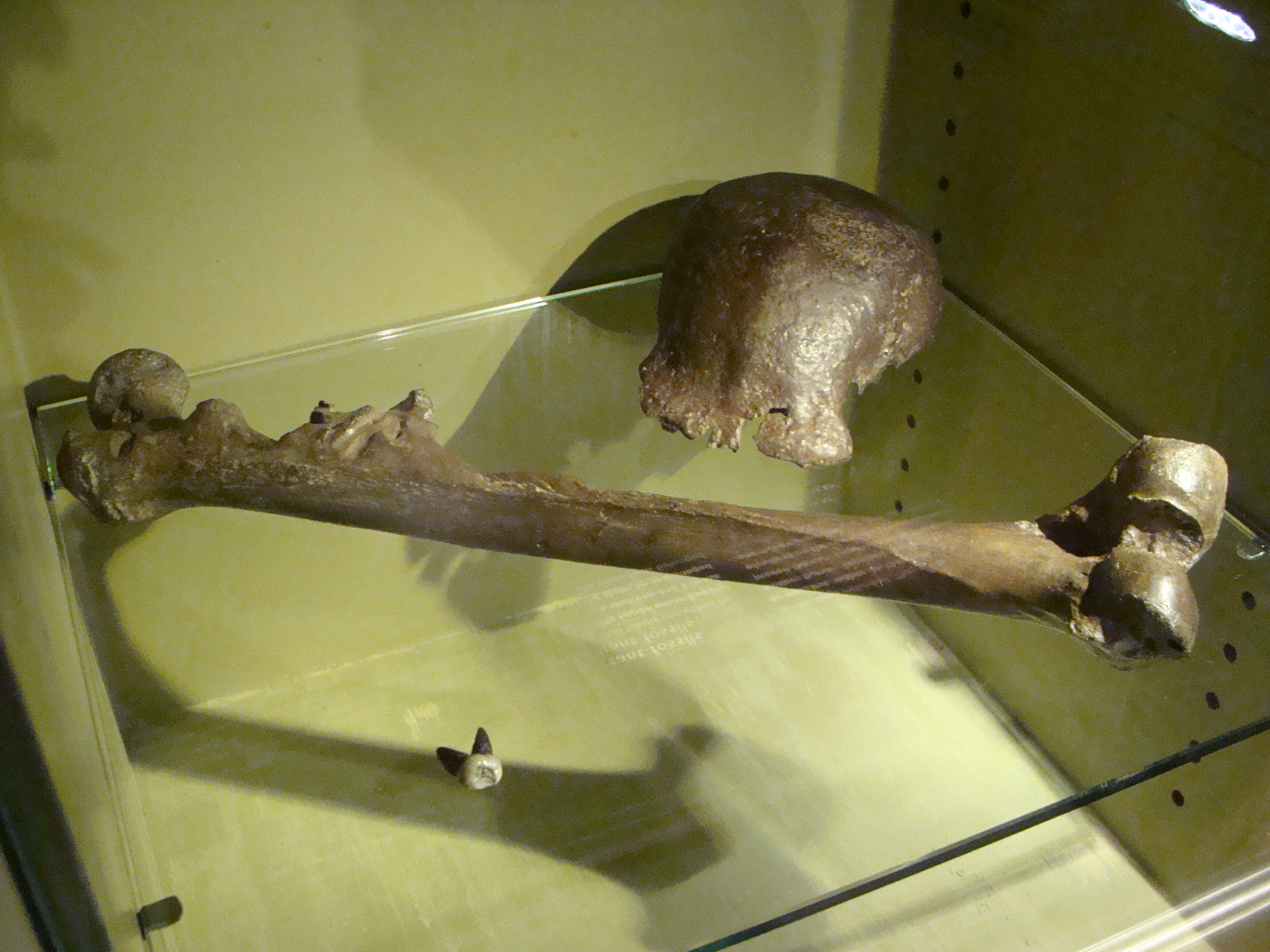
The syntype fossils of Java Man (H. e. erectus), at Naturalis, Leiden

In 2007, an analysis of cut marks on two bovid bones found in Sangiran, showed them to have been made 1.5 to 1.6 million years ago by clamshell tools. This is the oldest evidence for the presence of early humans in Indonesia. Fossilised remains of Homo erectus in Indonesia, popularly known as the "Java Man" were first discovered by the Dutch anatomist Eugène Dubois at Trinil in 1891, and are at least 700,000 years old. Other H. erectus fossils of a similar age were found at Sangiran in the 1930s by the anthropologist Gustav Heinrich Ralph von Koenigswald, who in the same time period also uncovered fossils at Ngandong alongside more advanced tools, re-dated in 2011 to between 550,000 and 143,000 years old. In 1977 another H. erectus skull was discovered at Sambungmacan. In 2010, stone tools were discovered on Flores, dating from 1 million years ago. These are the earliest remains implying human seafaring technology. The earliest evidence of artistic activity ever found, in the form of diagonal etchings made with the use of a shark's tooth, was detected in 2014 on a 500,000-year-old fossil of a clam found in Java in the 1890s, associated with H. erectus.

In 2003, on the island of Flores, fossils of a 1.1 m (3 ft 7 in) tall hominid dated between 74,000 and 13,000 years old were discovered, much to the surprise of the scientific community. This newly discovered hominid was named the "Flores Man", or Homo floresiensis. A phylogenetic analysis published in 2017 suggests that H. floresiensis was descended from the same ancestor as Homo habilis. H. floresiensis would thus represent a previously unknown and very early migration out of Africa. The Homo floresiensis skeletal material is dated from 60,000 to 100,000 years ago; stone tools recovered alongside the skeletal remains were from archaeological horizons ranging from 50,000 to 190,000 years ago.

=== Early Homo sapiens ===
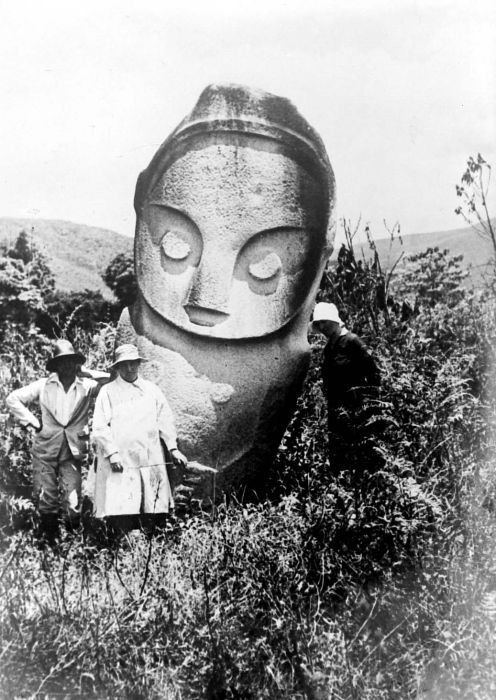
A megalithic statue in the Bada Valley, Lore Lindu National Park, Central Sulawesi. Estimated to be up to 5,000 years old, these stone figures are part of a little-understood prehistoric culture. Dozens of megaliths with human-like and abstract forms are found throughout the region.

The Indonesian archipelago was formed during the thaw after the Last Glacial Maximum. Early humans travelled by sea and spread from mainland Asia eastward to New Guinea and Australia. Homo sapiens reached the region by around 45,000 years ago. In 2011, evidence was uncovered in neighbouring East Timor, showing that 42,000 years ago, these early settlers had high-level maritime skills, and by implication the technology needed to make ocean crossings to reach Australia and other islands, as they were catching and consuming large numbers of big deep sea fish such as tuna.

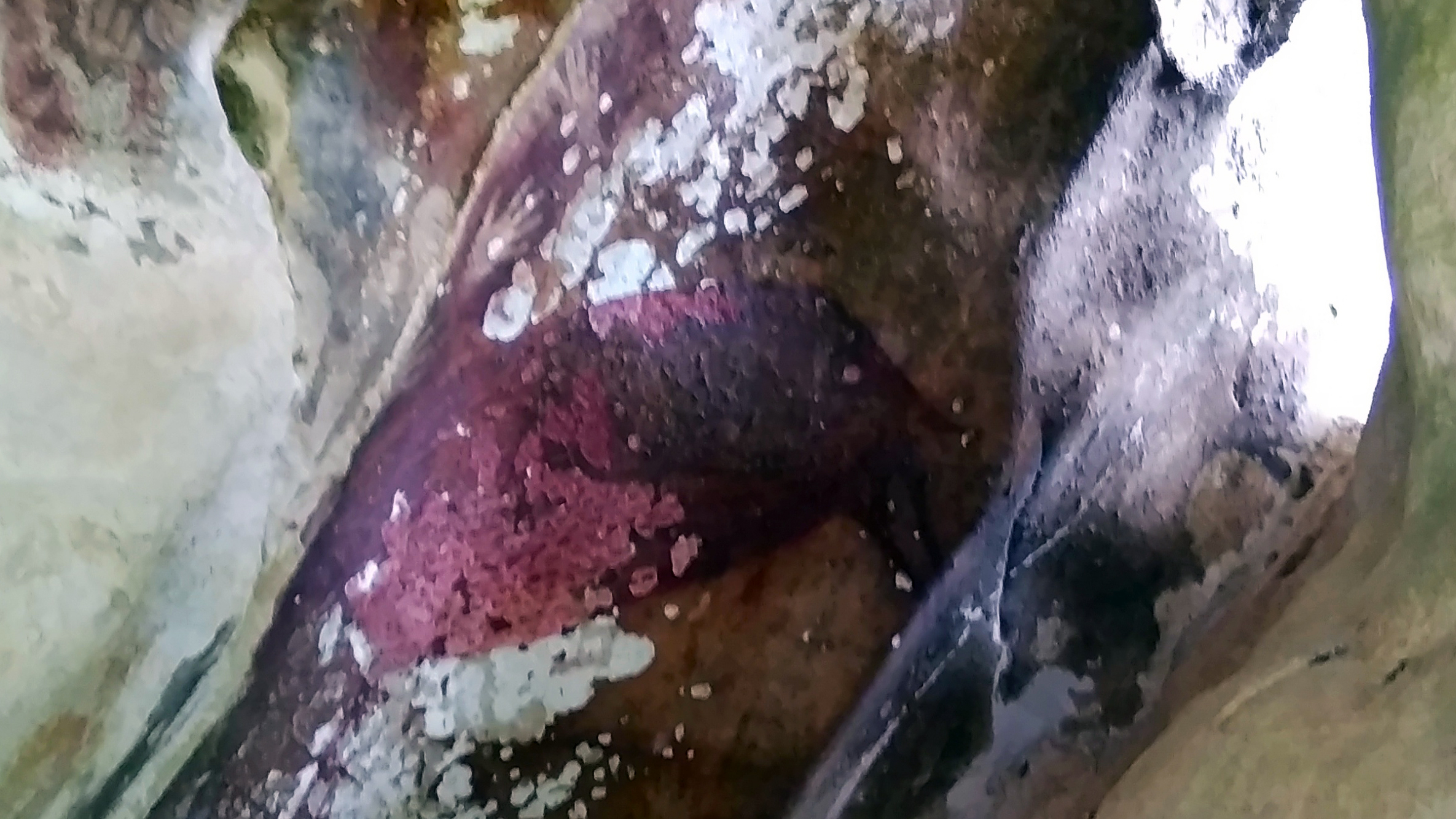
Cave paintings depicting a wild boar hunt in the Maros-Pangkep karst of Sulawesi are estimated to be at least 43,900 years old. This finding was recognized as "the oldest known depiction of storytelling and the earliest instance of figurative art in human history.”

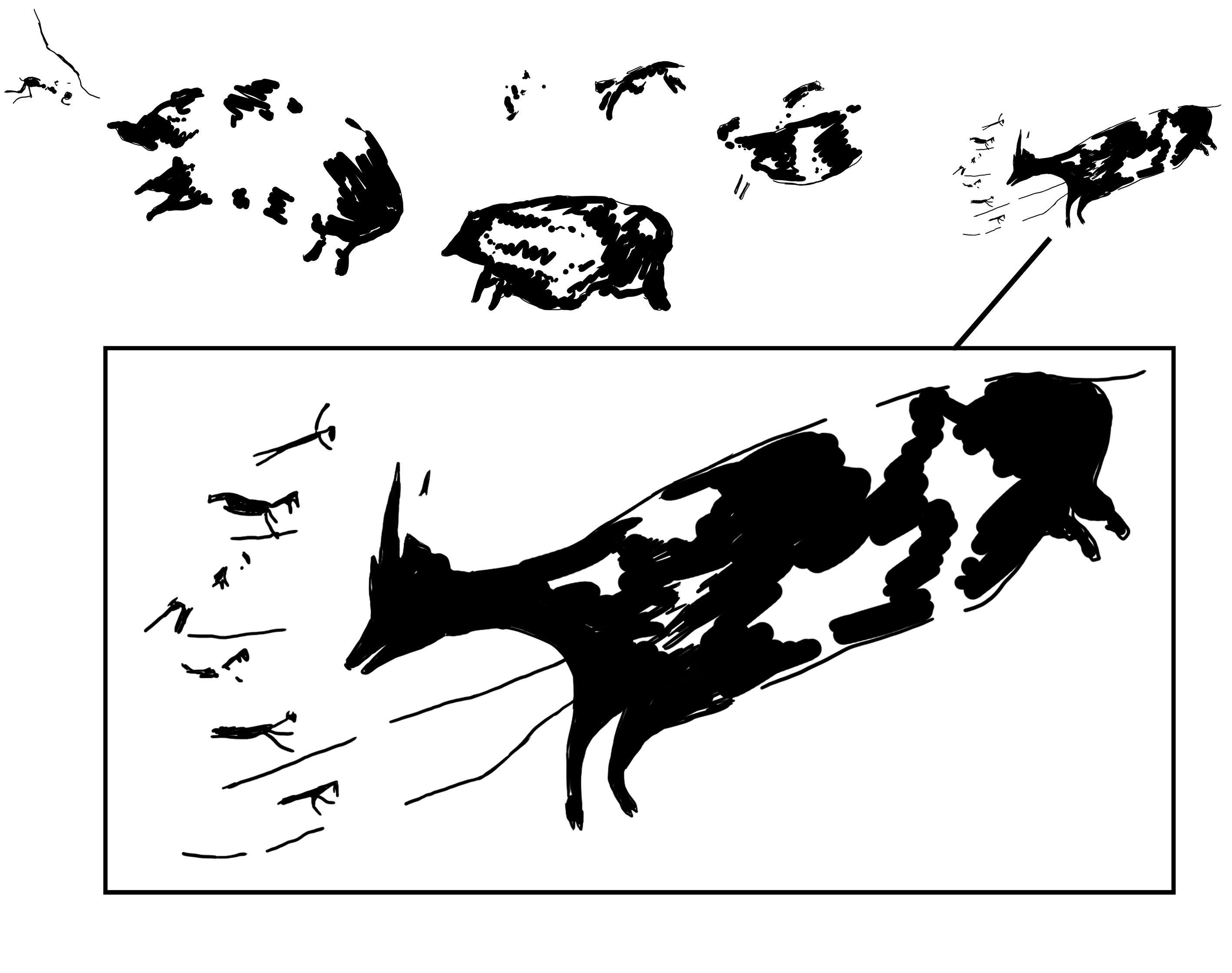
Redrawing of hunting scene from the Caves in the Maros-Pangkep karst

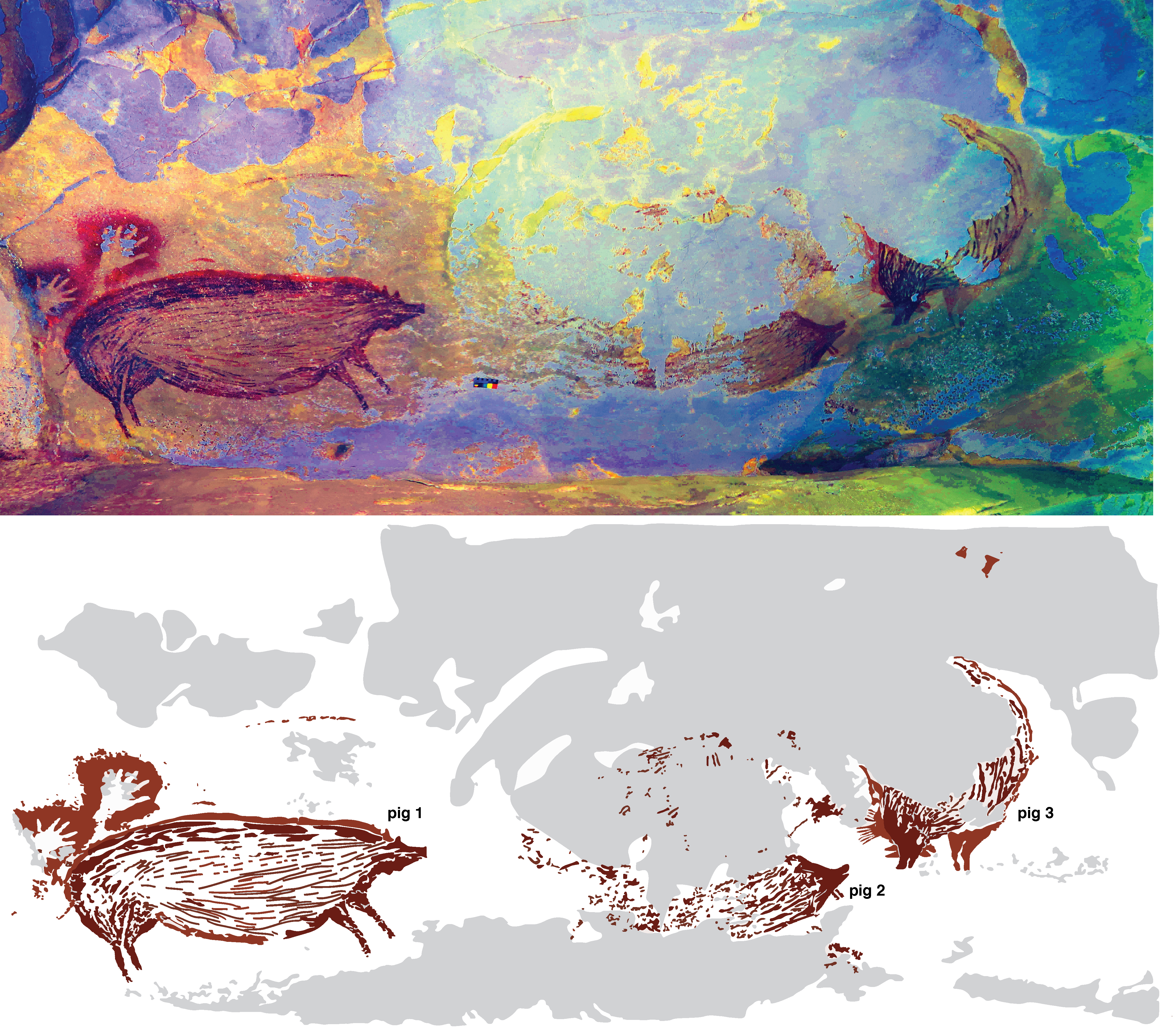
In 2021, researchers discovered cave art in Leang Tedongnge, estimated to be at least 45,500 years old, making it the world’s oldest known representational artwork.

In November 2018, scientists reported the discovery of the then-oldest known figurative art painting, over 40,000 (perhaps as old as 52,000) years old, of an unknown animal, in the cave of Lubang Jeriji Saléh on the Indonesian island of Borneo. The discovery of the cave paintings is important within human cultural history, as it adds to the view that cave art was created simultaneously in Indonesia and Europe. Francesco d'Errico, an expert in prehistoric art at the University of Bordeaux, described the investigation as a "major archaeological discovery". On 11 December 2019, a team of researchers led by Dr. Maxime Aubert announced the discovery of the oldest hunting scenes in prehistoric art in the world which is more than 44,000 years old from the limestone cave of Leang Bulu' Sipong 4. Archaeologists determined the age of the depiction of hunting a pig and buffalo thanks to the calcite 'popcorn', different isotope levels of radioactive uranium and thorium.

An elaborate 4.5 m long rock art panel in a limestone cave at Leang Bulu' in Sulawesi is sometimes considered the earliest figurative artwork in the world. It portrays several figures hunting wild pigs and dwarf bovids. This rock art was dated to at least 43,900 years ago on the basis of uranium-series analysis of overlying speleothems. A painted hand stencil from Leang Timpuseng, which has a minimum age of 39,900 years, is now the oldest known hand stencil in the world. Discoveries in 2021 revealed that this cave, Leang Tedongnge, has cave art with a minimum age of 45,500 years old, which made it the earliest known representational work of art in the world. On July 3, 2024, the journal Nature published research findings indicating that the cave paintings which depict anthropomorphic figures interacting with a pig and measure 36 by 15 inches (91 by 38 cm) in Leang Karampuang are approximately 51,200 years old, establishing them as the oldest known paintings in the world.

=== Austronesian Expansion ===
Austronesian people form the majority of the modern population. They may have arrived in Indonesia around 2000 BCE and are thought to have originated in Taiwan. During this period, parts of Indonesia participated in the Maritime Jade Road, with outlets in Kalimantan which existed for 3,000 years between 2000 BCE to 1000 CE. Dong Son culture spread to Indonesia bringing with it techniques of wet-field rice cultivation, ritual buffalo sacrifice, bronze casting, megalithic practises, and ikat weaving methods. Some of these practices remain in areas including the Batak areas of Sumatra, Toraja in Sulawesi, and several islands in Nusa Tenggara. Early Indonesians were animists who honoured the spirits of the dead believing their souls or life force could still help the living.

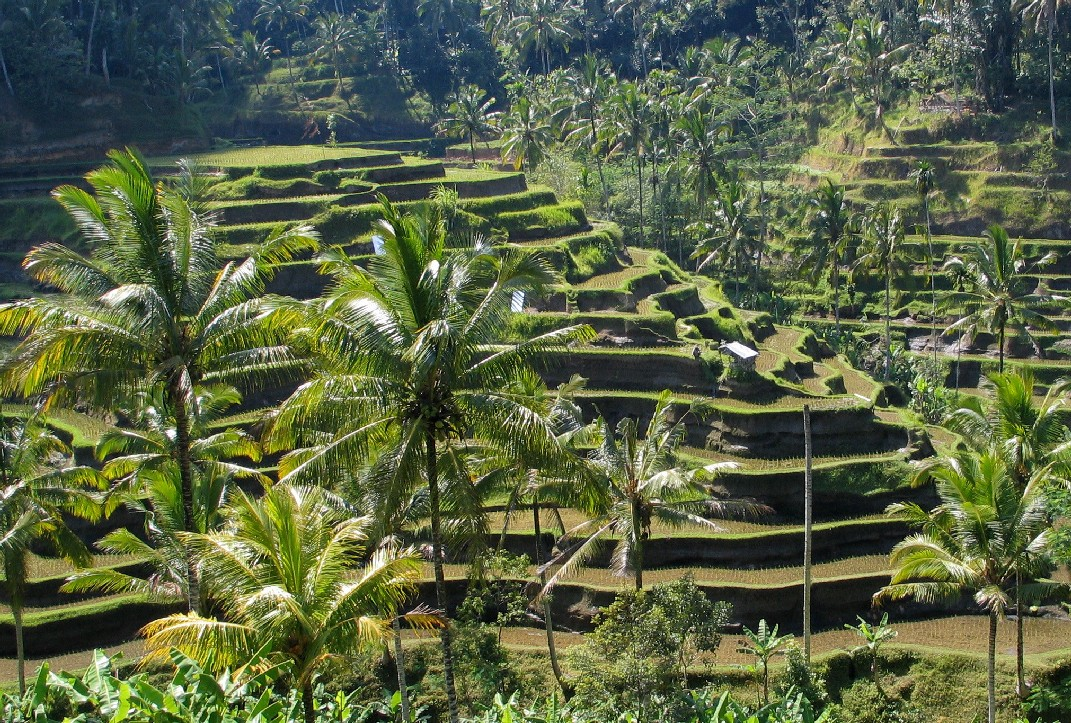
Example of rice terraces in Indonesia

Ideal agricultural conditions, and the mastering of wet-field rice cultivation as early as the 8th century BCE, allowed villages, towns, and small kingdoms to flourish by the 1st century CE. These kingdoms (little more than collections of villages subservient to petty chieftains) evolved with their own ethnic and tribal religions. Java's hot and even temperature, abundant rain and volcanic soil, was perfect for wet rice cultivation. Such agriculture required a well-organized society, in contrast to the society based on dry-field rice, which is a much simpler form of cultivation that does not require an elaborate social structure to support it.

Buni culture clay pottery flourished in coastal northern West Java and Banten around 400 BCE to 100 CE. The Buni culture was probably the predecessor of the Tarumanagara kingdom, one of the earliest Hindu kingdoms in Indonesia, producing numerous inscriptions and marking the beginning of the historical period in Java.

== Hindu-Buddhist civilizations ==
=== Early kingdoms ===
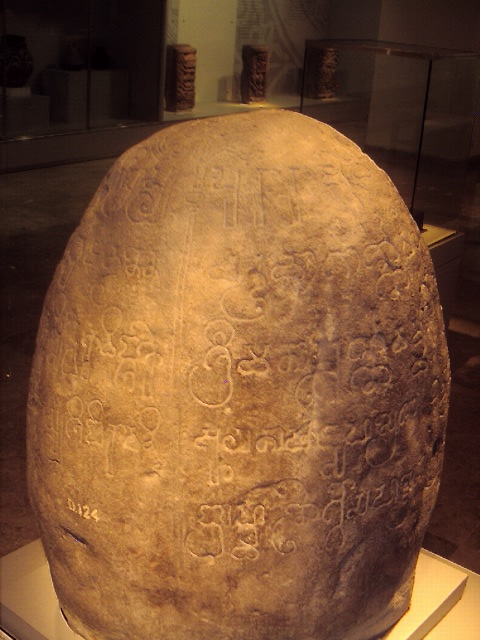
Stone inscription from the era of Purnawarman, king of Tarumanagara (circa 6th century CE), found in Tugu sub-district of Jakarta

Indonesia, like much of Southeast Asia, were influenced by Indian culture. This process of cultural interaction involved the selective adoption and adaptation of Hindu and Buddhist culture by Indonesian communities, in the context of the mid-first millennium Sanskrit cosmopolis in southern Asia. Several models have been proposed to explain the process of cultural interaction, with ongoing debates about the relative importance of local and foreign agency.

References to the Dvipantara or Yawadvipa, a Hindu kingdom in Java and Sumatra appear in Sanskrit writings from 200 BCE. In India's earliest epic, the Ramayana, Sugriva, the chief of Rama's army dispatched his men to Yawadvipa, the island of Java, in search of Sita. According to the ancient Tamil text Manimekalai, Java had a kingdom with a capital called Nagapuram. The earliest archaeological relic discovered in Indonesia is from Ujung Kulon National Park, West Java, where an early Hindu statue of Ganesha estimated to date from the 1st century CE was found at the summit of Mount Raksa in Panaitan island. There is also archaeological evidence for the Sunda Kingdom in West Java dating from the 2nd-century, and Jiwa Temple in Batujaya, Karawang, West Java was also probably built around this time. South Indian culture was spread to Southeast Asia by the south Indian Pallava dynasty in the 4th and 5th centuries. and by the 5th century, stone inscriptions written in Pallava scripts were found in Java and Borneo.

A number of Hindu and Buddhist states flourished and then declined across Indonesia. Seven rough plinths dating from the beginning of the 4th century CE were found in Kutai, East Kalimantan, near the Mahakam River. These are known as the Yupa inscription or "Mulavarman Inscription" and are believed to be one of the earliest Sanskrit inscriptions in Indonesia. The plinths were written by Brahmins in the Sanskrit language using the Pallava script. They discuss a generous king by the name of Mulavarman who donated mamy alms to Brahmin priests in his kingdom. The kingdom was known as the Kutai Martadipura Kingdom and was located in present East Kalimantan Province. It is sometimes believed to be the oldest and first Hindu kingdom of Indonesia.

=== Tarumanagara and Heling ===
One such early kingdom was Tarumanagara, which flourished around the 5th century CE in West Java close to modern-day Jakarta. Its king Purnawarman issued the earliest known inscriptions on Java, including the Tugu inscription, the Ciaruteun inscription located near Bogor, the Pasir Awi inscription and the Muncul inscription. These inscriptions are written in Sanskrit in Late Southern Brahmi script (also known as Pallava script in the Indonesian context). Purnawarman apparently built a canal that changed the course of the Cakung River, and drained a coastal area for agriculture and settlement purpose. In his stone inscriptions, Purnawarman associated himself with Vishnu, and Brahmins ritually secured the hydraulic project.

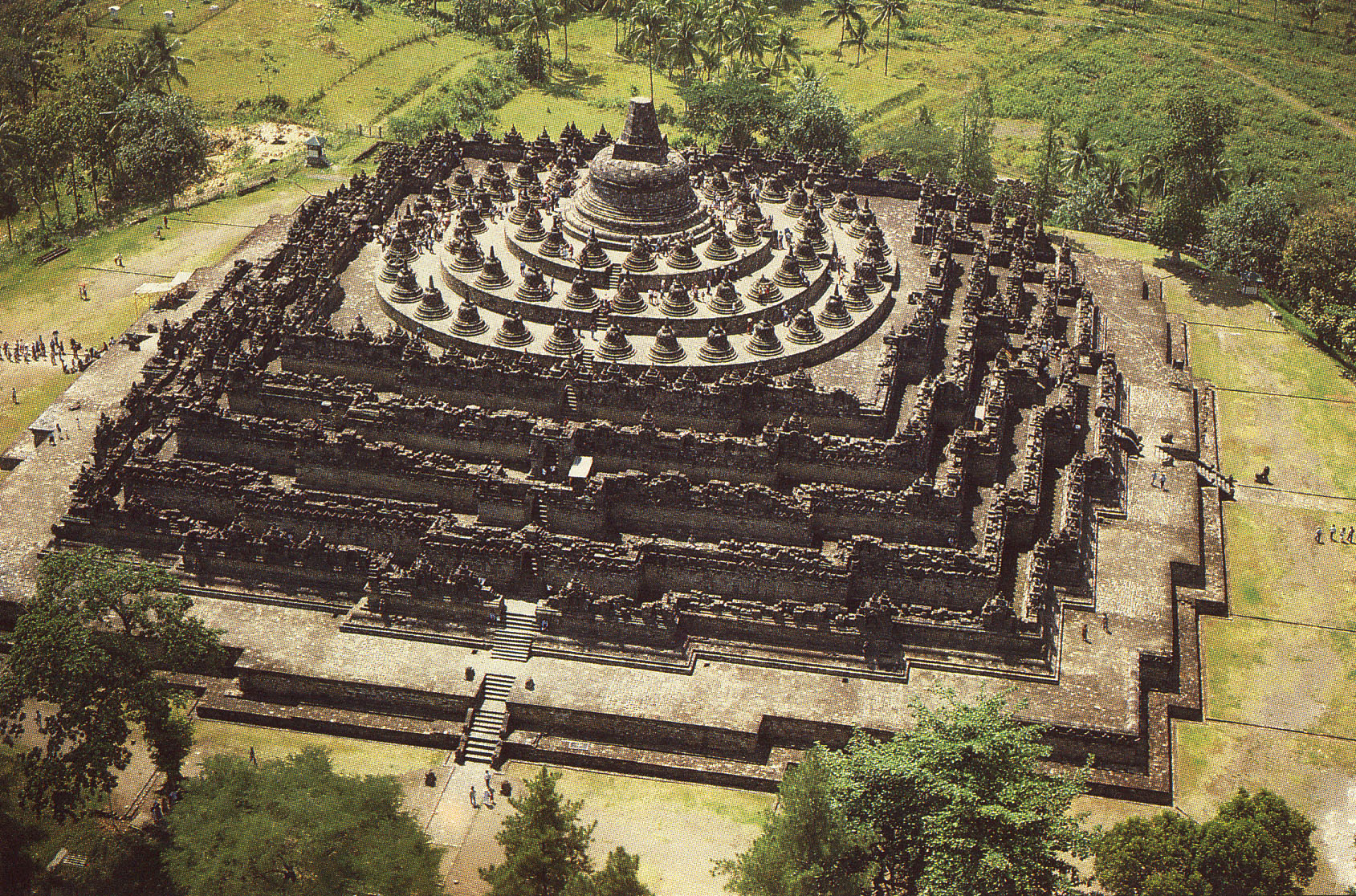
8th-century Borobudur Buddhist monument, Sailendra dynasty, is the largest Buddhist temple in the world.

In the 6th to 7th centuries, the Heling kingdom (Late Middle Chinese: 訶陵 [hɑ.lɨŋ]) was established on the northern coast of Central Java. This kingdom is known only from Chinese records. Scholars previously believed this name of this kingdom was derived from the Indian kingdom of Kalinga, but more recent research has cast doubt on this etymology. Early temple sites along the north central coast of Java, such as Balekambang and Bototumpang, are contemporary with Heling. It is believed that the territory of Heling was absorbed by the northward expansion of Mataram in the second half of the eighth century.

=== Mataram ===
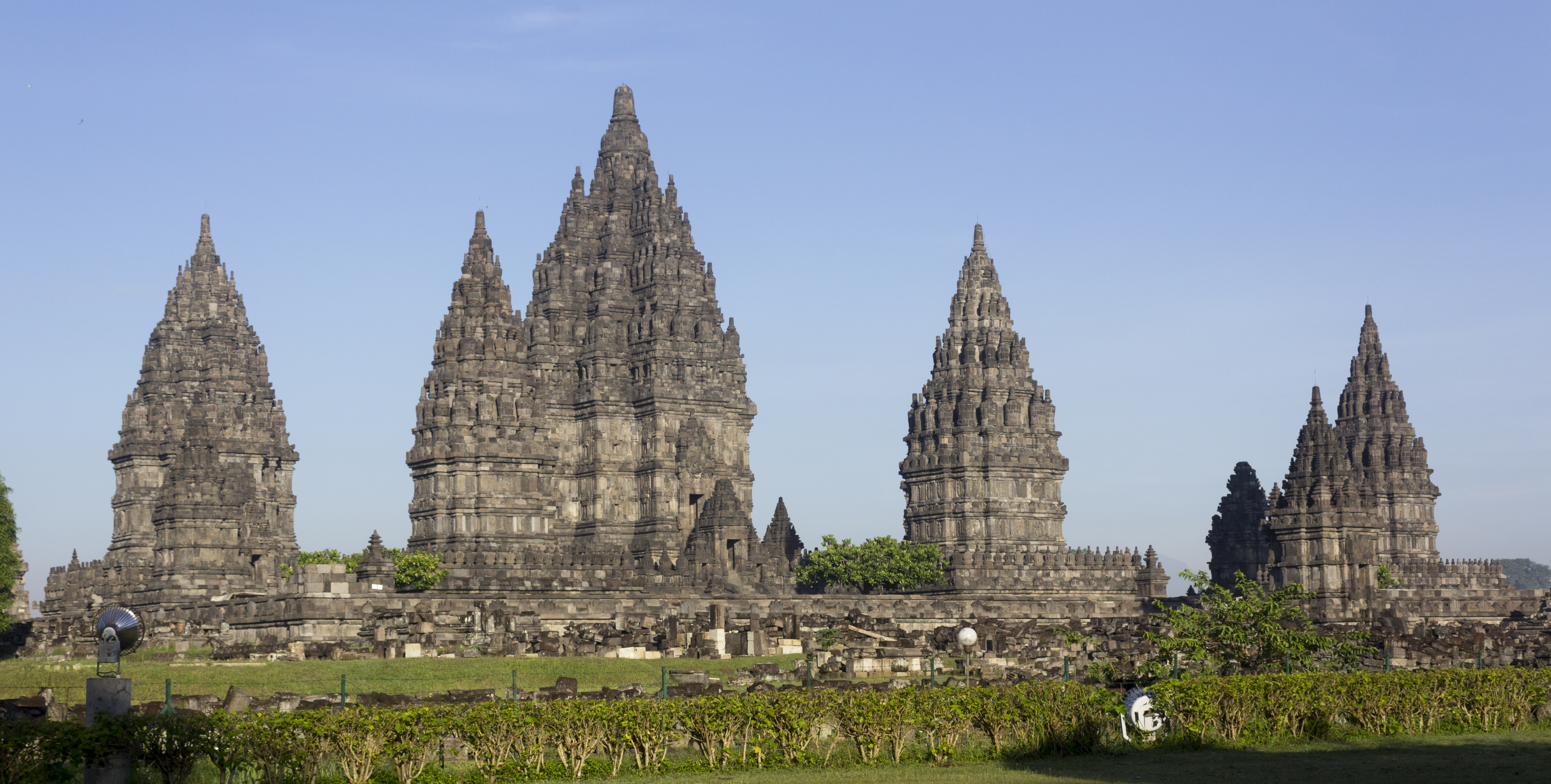
Prambanan in Java was built during the Sanjaya dynasty of Mataram kingdom; it is one of the largest Hindu temple complexes in Southeast Asia.

The Mataram Kingdom was an Indianized kingdom based in Central Java around modern-day Yogyakarta between the 8th and 10th centuries. The kingdom was ruled by a succession of kings, some of whom claimed descend from the Shailendra dynasty. The dynastic history of Mataram, including whether there existed one or two separate royal dynasties, is still a matter of debate among scholars.

Beginning with Sanjaya's Canggal inscription, the rulers of Mataram left significant numbers of stone and metal inscriptions. It is in these inscriptions that the Old Javanese is first attested as a written language.

In the eighth and ninth centuries, the kingdom saw the blossoming of classical Javanese art and architecture. Some of Indonesia's finest examples of stone and metal sculpture, such as the Wonoboyo hoard of golden artefacts, were created during the Mataram period. A rapid increase in temple construction occurred across the landscape of its heartland in Mataram (Kedu and Kewu Plain). The most notable temples constructed in Mataram are Kalasan, Sewu, Borobudur and Prambanan.

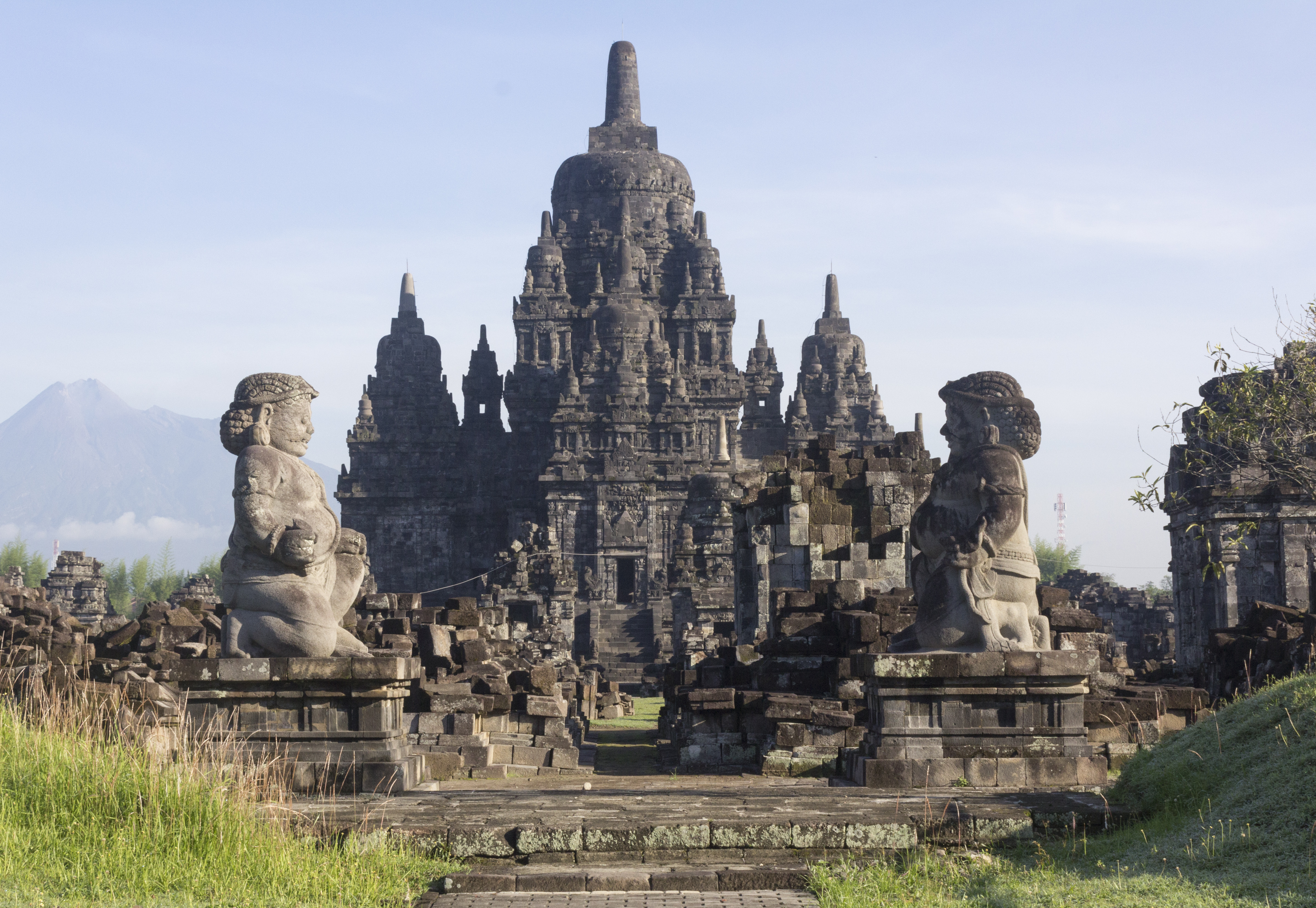
Sewu temple in Special Region of Yogyakarta

The Shivagrha inscription gives some evidence political conflict between rival factions in the Mataram kingdom during the 840s. Some researchers interpreted this as a religious conflict between the Sanjaya dynasty of Mataram kingdom in Java led by Rakai Pikatan and the Shailendra dynasty of the Srivijaya kingdom led by Balaputradewa. The monumental Hindu temple of Prambanan in the vicinity of Yogyakarta was built by the Lord of Pikatan around this time.

The centre of the kingdom was moved from Central Java to East Java by Mpu Sindok in 929. The reasons for this move are not known for certain, though some scholars have hypothesised that an eruption of the volcano Mount Merapi, or political pressure from Sailendrans based in the Srivijaya Empire may have caused the move.

From his new base in East Java, Sindok founded the Īśana dynasty which ruled in Java and Bali until the late 11th century. One his successors, King Dharmawangsa, sponsored the translation of the Mahabharata into Old Javanese in the 990s CE. The Īśana dynasty was briefly overthrown in 1017 by rebellion by the king of Wurawari near Ponorogo. However the dynasty survived and, through the military efforts of king Airlangga, son of the king and queen of Bali, gradually re-established its authority of parts of Sindok's old territory between 1019 and 1037. Airlangga's domain became known as the Kahuripan kingdom.

=== Srivijaya ===
Srivijaya was a kingdom on Sumatra which influenced much of the Maritime Southeast Asia. From the 7th century, the powerful Srivijaya naval kingdom flourished as a result of trade and the influences of Hinduism and Buddhism that were imported with it.

Srivijaya was centred in the coastal trading centre of present-day Palembang. Srivijaya was not a "state" in the modern sense with defined boundaries and a centralised government to which the citizens own allegiance. Rather Srivijaya was a confederacy form of society centred on a royal heartland. It was a thalassocracy and did not extend its influence far beyond the coastal areas of the islands of Southeast Asia. Trade was the driving force of Srivijaya just as it is for most societies throughout history. The Srivijayan navy controlled the trade that made its way through the Strait of Malacca.

The territory of the Srivijaya empire. Historically, Srivijaya was one of the largest kingdoms in Southeast Asia.

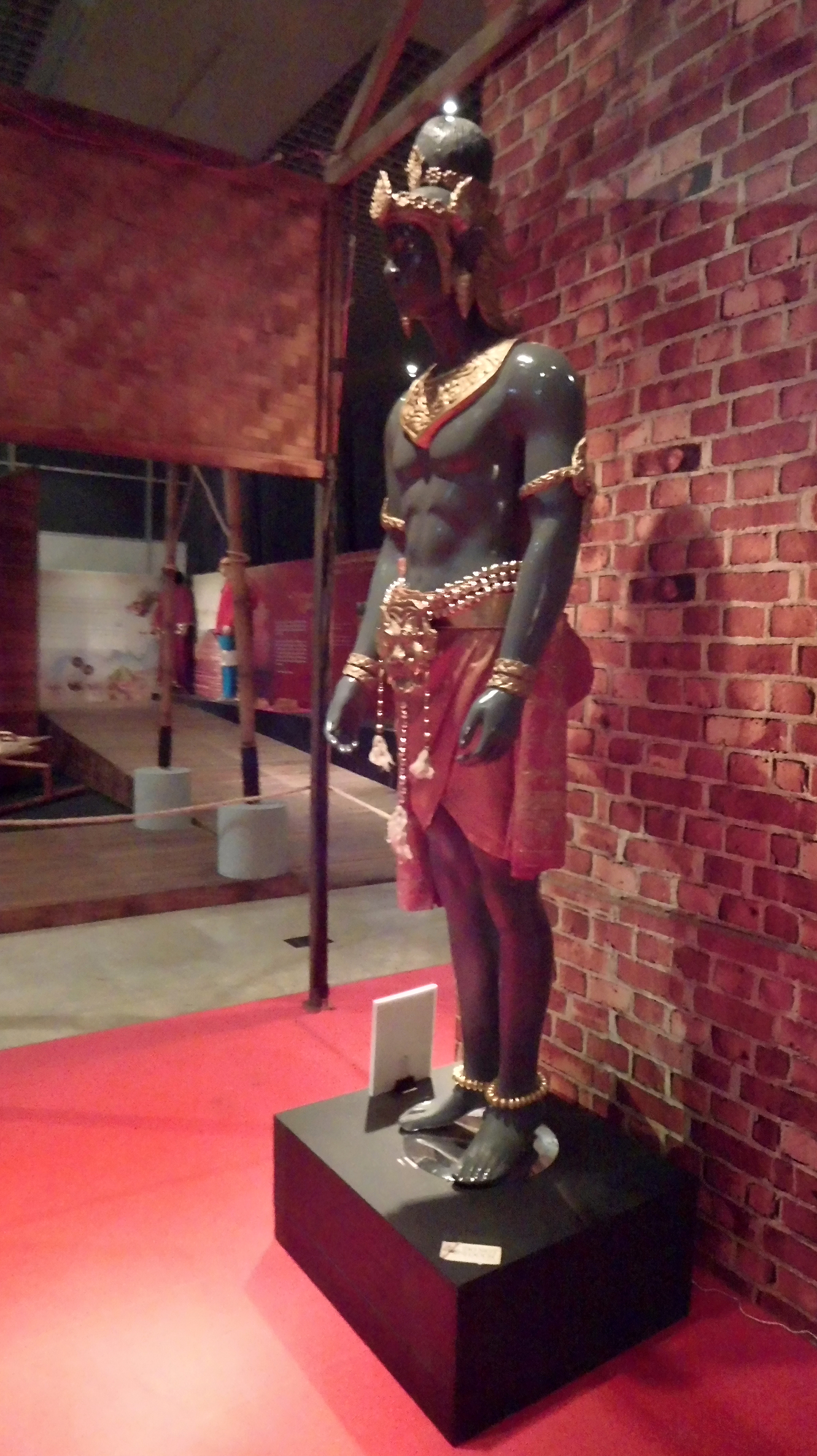
The depiction of Dapunta Hyang Sri Jayanasa, the first king of Srivijaya

By the 7th century, the harbours of various vassal states of Srivijaya lined both coasts of the Straits of Melaka. Around this time, Srivijaya had established suzerainty over large areas of Sumatra, western Java, and much of the Malay Peninsula. Dominating the Malacca and Sunda straits, the empire controlled both the Spice Route traffic and local trade. It remained a formidable sea power until the 13th century. This spread the ethnic Malay culture throughout Sumatra, the Malay Peninsula, and western Borneo. A stronghold of Mahayana Buddhism, Srivijaya attracted pilgrims and scholars from other parts of Asia.

The relation between Srivijaya and the Chola Empire of southern India was friendly during the reign of Raja Raja Chola I but during the reign of Rajendra Chola I the Chola Empire attacked Srivijaya cities. A series of Chola raids in the 11th century weakened the Srivijayan hegemony and enabled the formation of regional kingdoms based, like Kediri, on intensive agriculture rather than coastal and long-distance trade. Srivijayan influence waned by the 11th century. The island was in frequent conflict with the Javanese kingdoms, first Singhasari and then Majapahit. Islam eventually made its way to the Aceh region of Sumatra, spreading its influence through contacts with Arabs and Indian traders. By the late 13th century, the kingdom of Pasai in northern Sumatra converted to Islam. The last inscription dates to 1374, where a crown prince, Ananggavarman, is mentioned. Srivijaya ceased to exist by 1414, when Parameswara, the kingdom's last prince, fled to Temasik, then to Malacca. Later his son converted to Islam and founded the Sultanate of Malacca on the Malay peninsula.

=== Singhasari and Majapahit ===
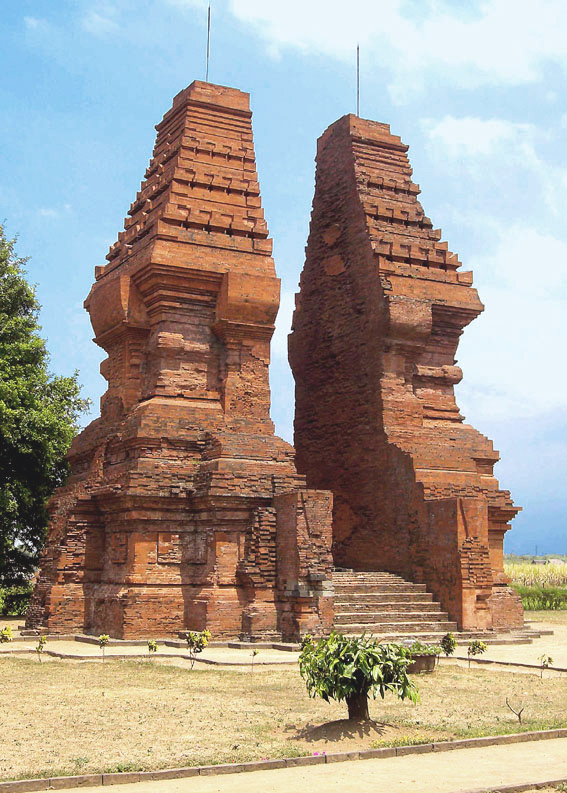
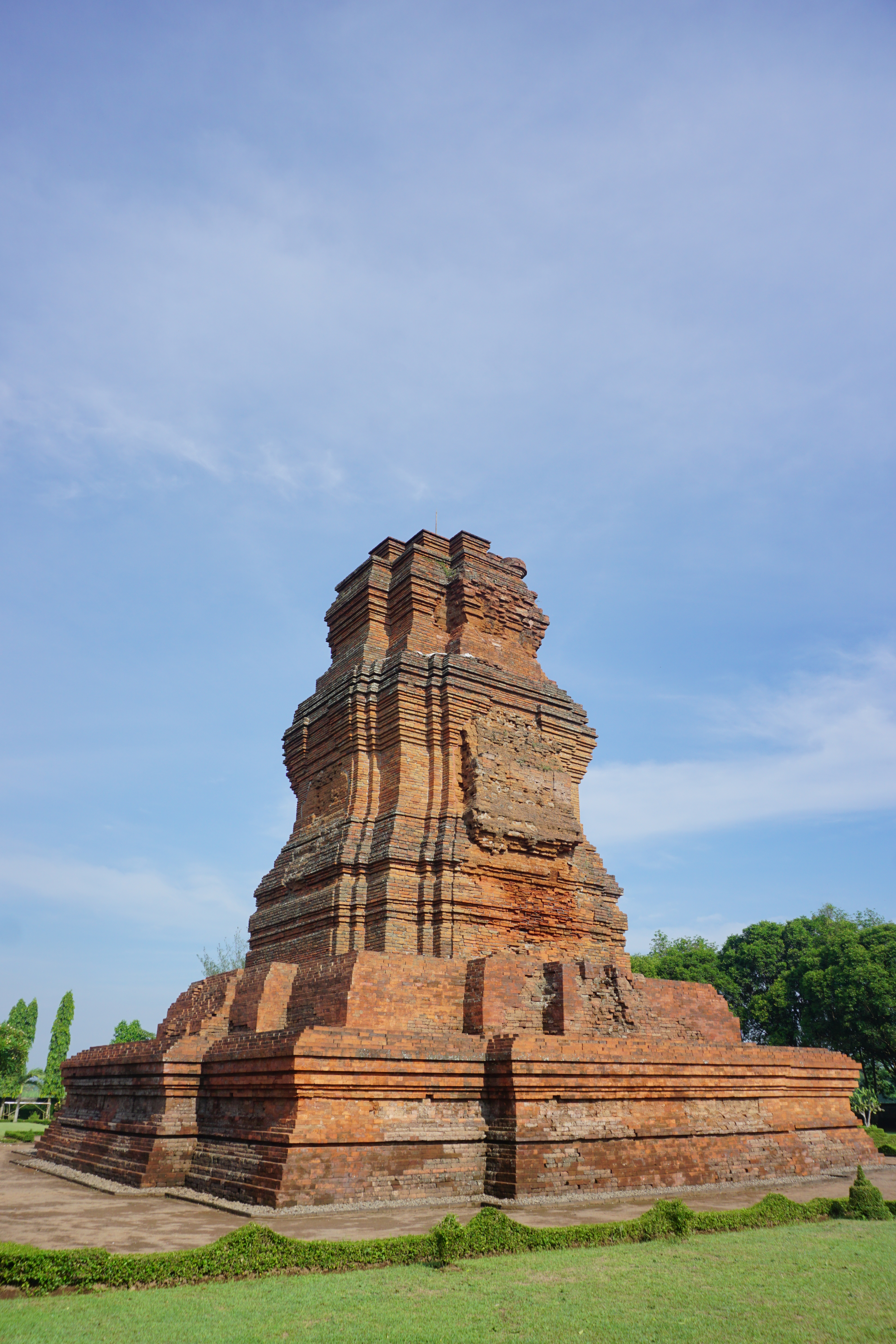
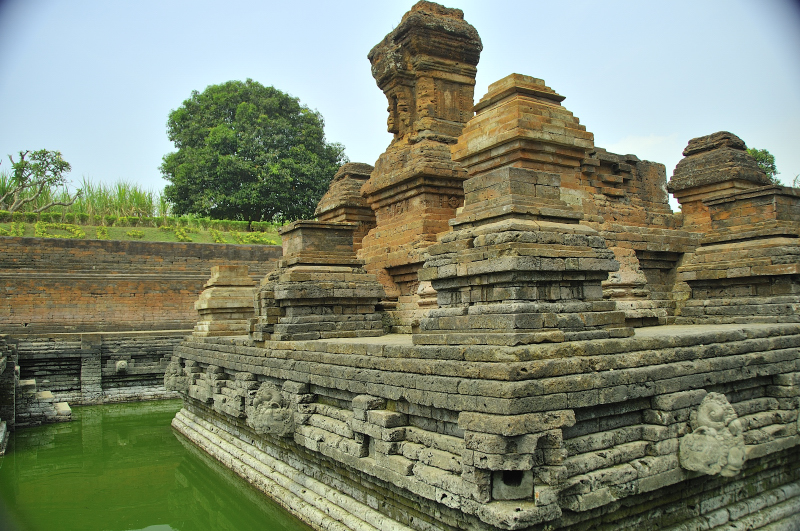
Archaeological remains in Trowulan, the capital city of the Majapahit

Expansion of the Majapahit empire extended to much of the Indonesian archipelago until it receded and fell in the early 16th century.

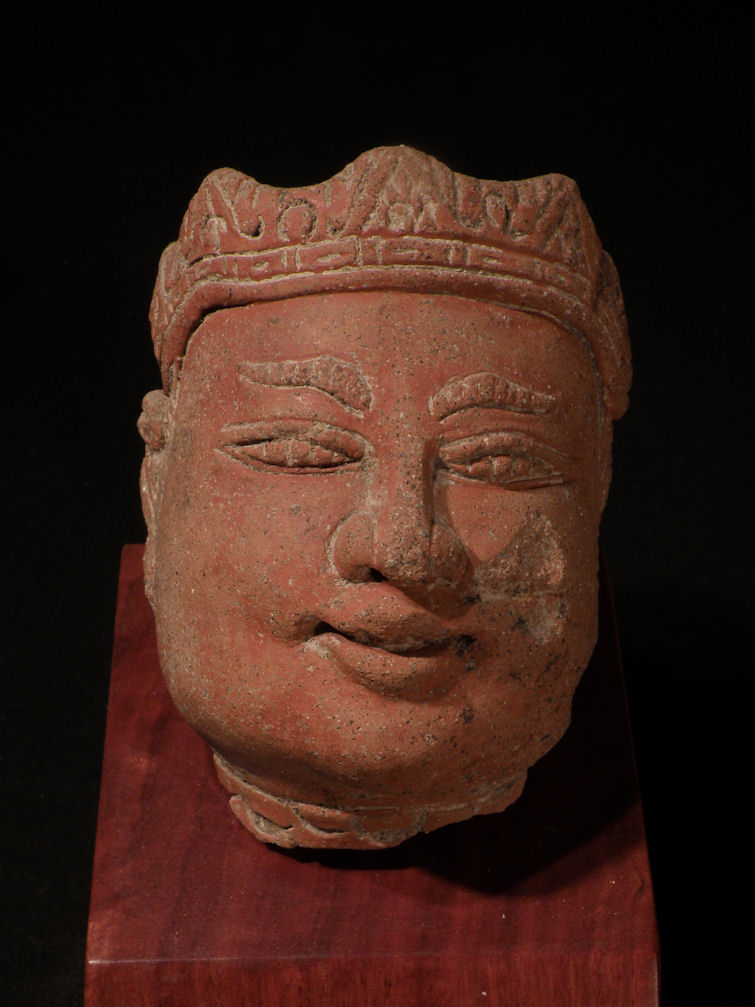
Modern illustration of Gajah Mada, a powerful military leader, credited with bringing the empire to its peak of glory

Majapahit was the most dominant of Indonesia's pre-Islamic states. The Hindu Majapahit kingdom was founded in eastern Java in the late 13th century, and under Gajah Mada it experienced what is often referred to as a golden age in Indonesian history, when its influence extended to much of southern Malay Peninsula, Borneo, Sumatra, and Bali from about 1293 to around 1500.

The founder of the Majapahit Empire, Kertarajasa, was the son-in-law of the ruler of the Singhasari kingdom, also based in Java. After Singhasari drove Srivijaya out of Java in 1290, the rising power of Singhasari came to the attention of Kublai Khan in China and he sent emissaries demanding tribute. Kertanagara, ruler of the Singhasari kingdom, refused to pay tribute and the Khan sent a punitive expedition which arrived off the coast of Java in 1293. By that time, a rebel from Kediri, Jayakatwang, had killed Kertanagara. The Majapahit founder allied himself with the Mongols against Jayakatwang and, once the Singhasari kingdom was destroyed, turned and forced his Mongol allies to withdraw in confusion.

Gajah Mada, a Majapahit prime minister and regent from 1331 to 1364, extended the empire's rule to the surrounding islands. A few years after Gajah Mada's death, the Majapahit navy captured Palembang, putting an end to the Sriwijaya kingdom. Although the Majapahit rulers extended their power over other islands and destroyed neighbouring kingdoms, their focus seems to have been on controlling and gaining a larger share of the commercial trade that passed through the archipelago. About the time Majapahit was founded, Muslim traders and proselytisers began entering the area. After its peak in the 14th century, Majapahit power began to decline and was unable to control the rising power of the Sultanate of Malacca. Dates for the end of the Majapahit Empire range from 1478 to 1520. A large number of courtiers, artisans, priests, and members of the royal family moved east to the island of Bali at the end of Majapahit power.

== Islamic civilizations ==
=== Spread of Islam ===
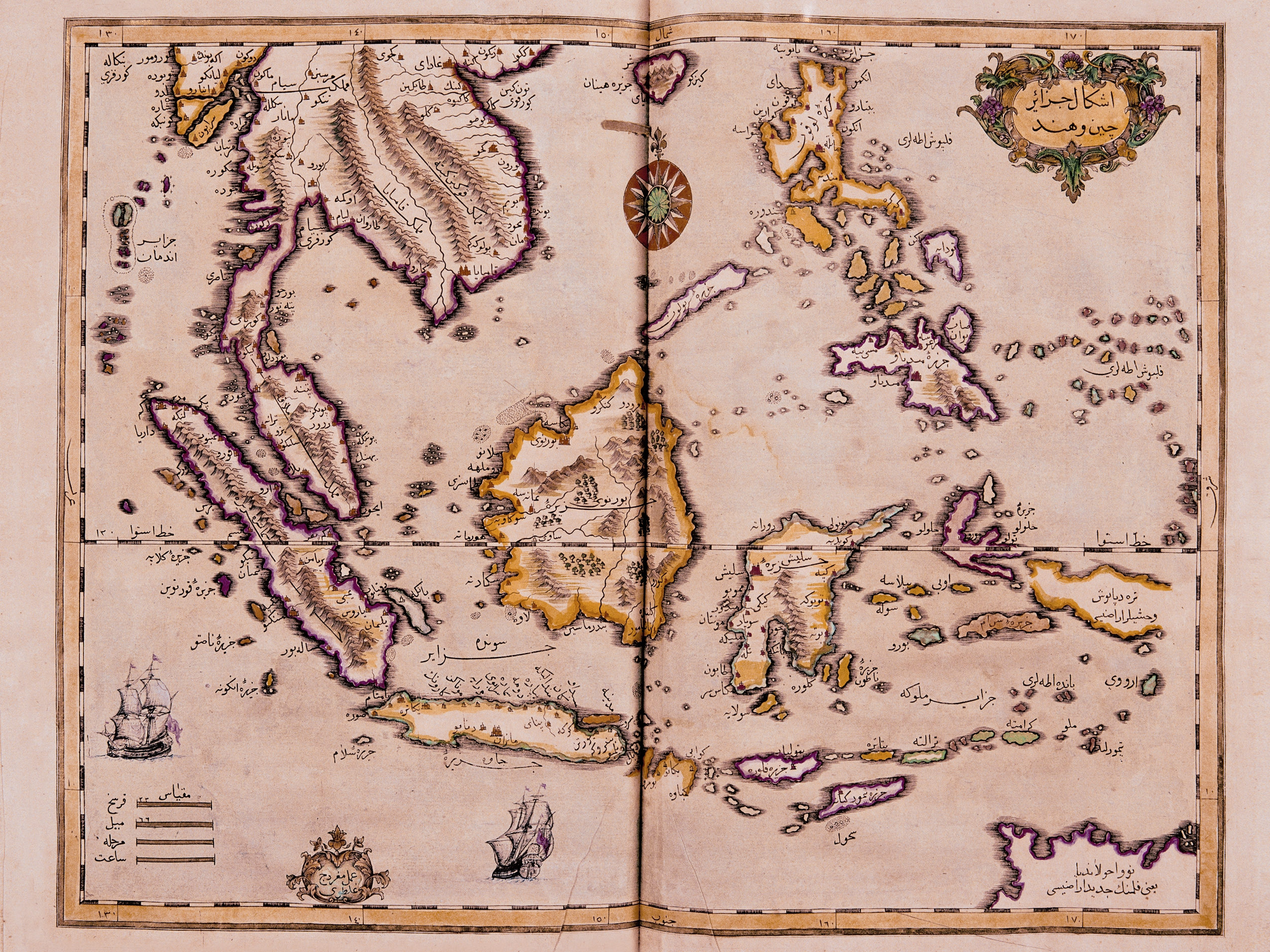
Map of Indonesia; 1674–1745 by Khatib Çelebi, a geographer from the Ottoman Turks.

The earliest accounts of the Indonesian archipelago date from the Abbasid Caliphate, according to those early accounts the Indonesian archipelago were famous among early Muslim sailors mainly due to its abundance of precious spice trade commodities such as nutmeg, cloves, galangal and many other spices.

Although Muslim traders first travelled through South East Asia early in the Islamic era, the spread of Islam among the inhabitants of the Indonesian archipelago dates to the 13th century in northern Sumatra.

Although it is known that the spread of Islam began in the west of the archipelago, the fragmentary evidence does not suggest a rolling wave of conversion through adjacent areas; rather, it suggests the process was complicated and slow. The spread of Islam was driven by increasing trade links outside of the archipelago; in general, traders and the royalty of major kingdoms were the first to adopt the new religion.

Other Indonesian areas gradually adopted Islam, making it the dominant religion in Java and Sumatra by the end of the 7th until 13th century. For the most part, Islam overlaid and mixed with existing cultural and religious influences, which shaped the predominant form of Islam in Indonesia, particularly in Java. Only Bali retained a Hindu majority. In the eastern archipelago, both Christian and Islamic missionaries were active in the 16th and 17th centuries, and, currently, there are large communities of both religions on these islands.

=== Sultanate of Mataram ===
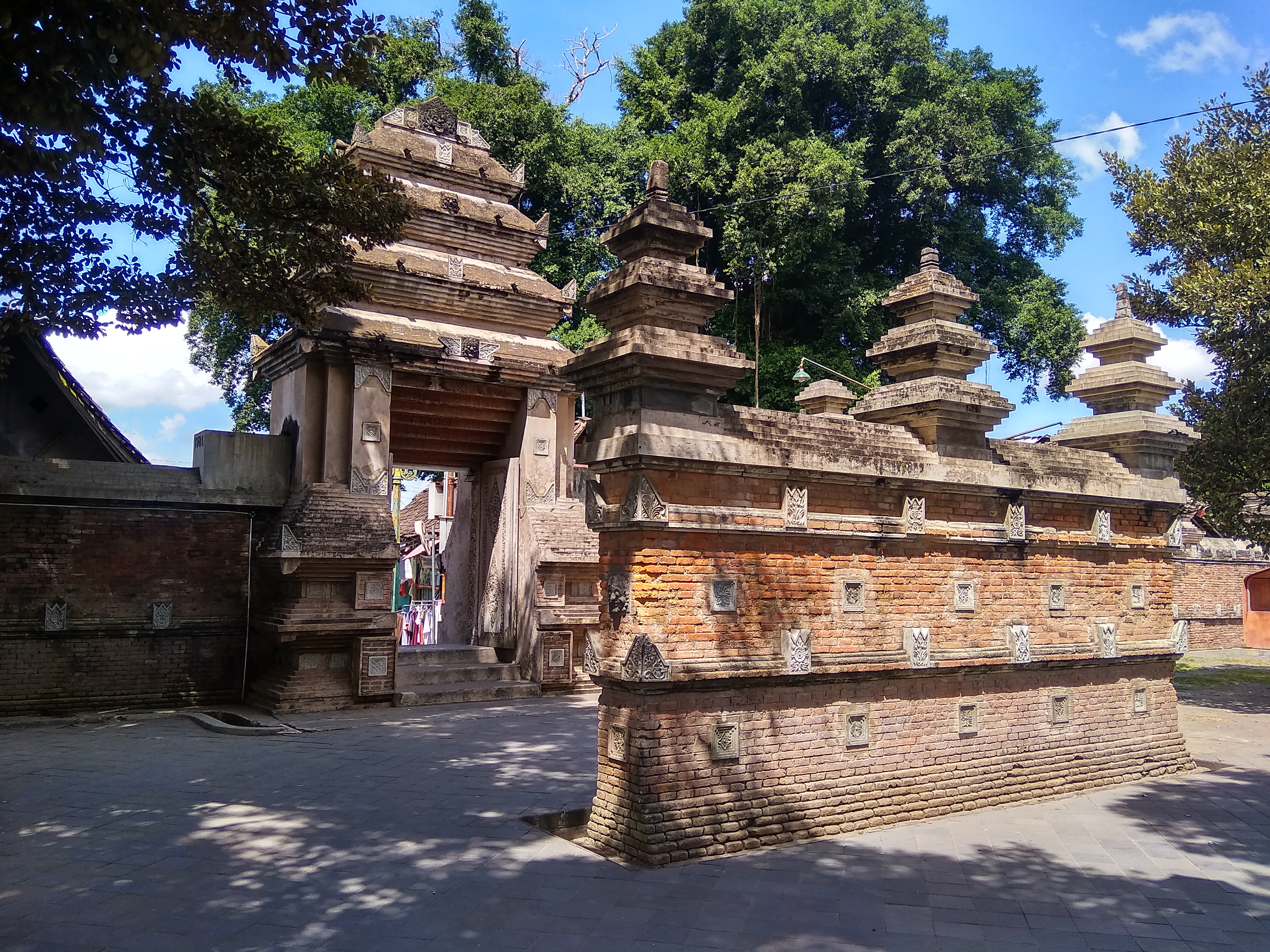
Gate of Masjid Agung Kotagede Mosque

The Sultanate of Mataram was the third Sultanate in Java, after the Sultanate of Demak Bintoro and the Sultanate of Pajang.

According to Javanese records, Kyai Gedhe Pamanahan became the ruler of the Mataram area in the 1570s with the support of the kingdom of Pajang to the east, near the current site of Surakarta (Solo). Pamanahan was often referred to as Kyai Gedhe Mataram after his ascension.

Pamanahan's son, Panembahan Senapati, replaced his father on the throne around 1584. Under Senapati the kingdom grew substantially through regular military campaigns against Mataram's neighbours. Shortly after his accession, for example, he conquered his father's patrons in Pajang.

The reign of Panembahan Seda ing Krapyak (Suhusunan Anyakrawati) (c. 1601–1613), the son of Senapati, was dominated by further warfare, especially against powerful Surabaya, already a major centre in East Java. The first contact between Mataram and the Dutch East India Company (VOC) occurred under Krapyak. Dutch activities at the time were limited to trading from limited coastal settlements, so their interactions with the inland Mataram kingdom were limited, although they did form an alliance against Surabaya in 1613. Krapyak died that year.

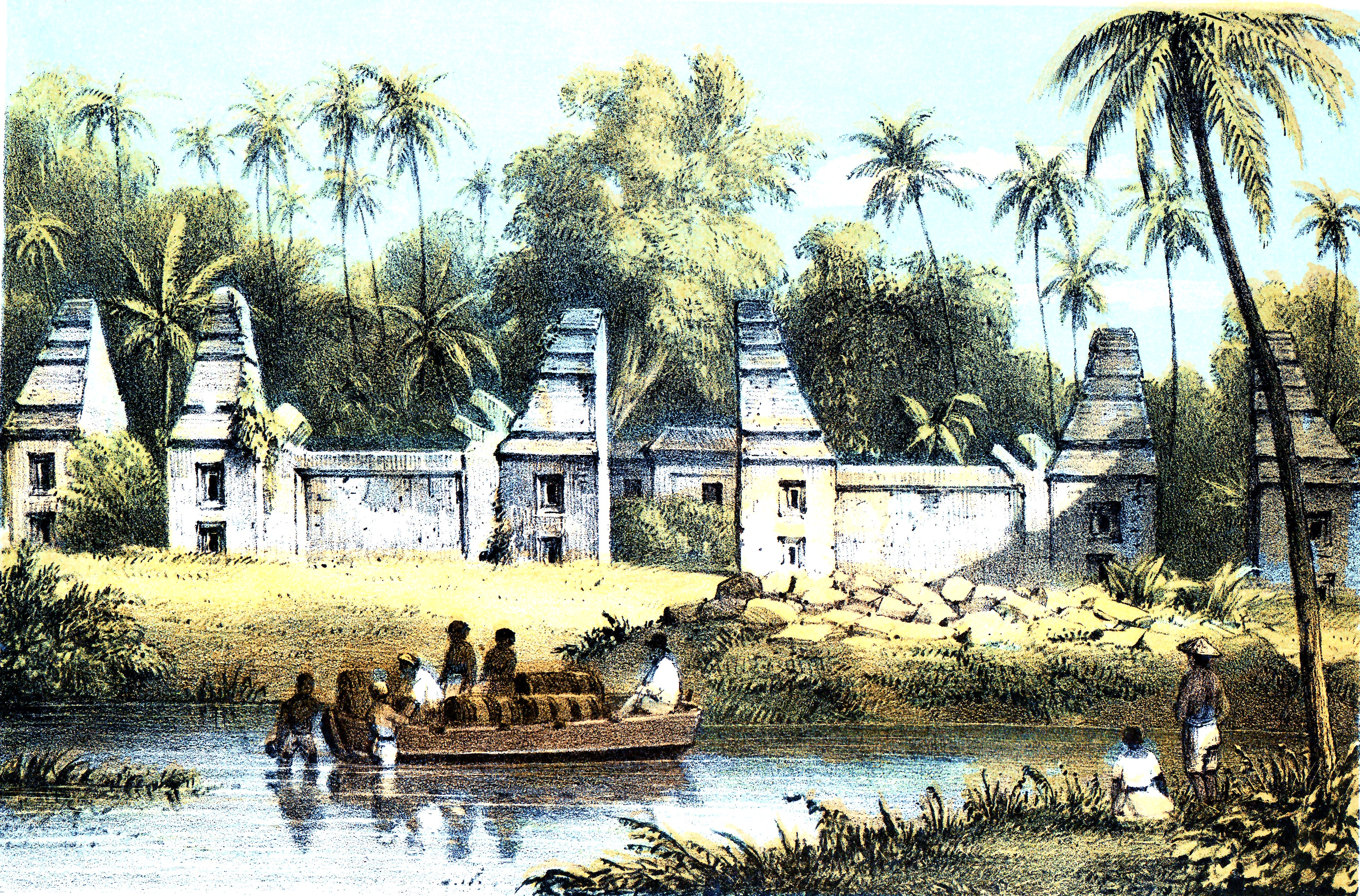
Ruins of the Sultanate of Banten Palace in 1859

Krapyak was succeeded by his son, who is known simply as Sultan Agung ("Great Sultan") in Javanese records. Agung was responsible for the great expansion and lasting historical legacy of Mataram due to the extensive military conquests of his long reign from 1613 to 1646.

=== Sultanate of Banten ===
In 1524–25, Sunan Gunung Jati from Cirebon, together with the armies of Demak Sultanate, seized the port of Banten from the Sunda kingdom, and established The Sultanate of Banten. This was accompanied by Muslim preachers and the adoption of Islam amongst the local population. At its peak in the first half of the 17th century, the Sultanate lasted from 1526 to 1813 AD. The Sultanate left many archaeological remains and historical records.

== European colonization ==
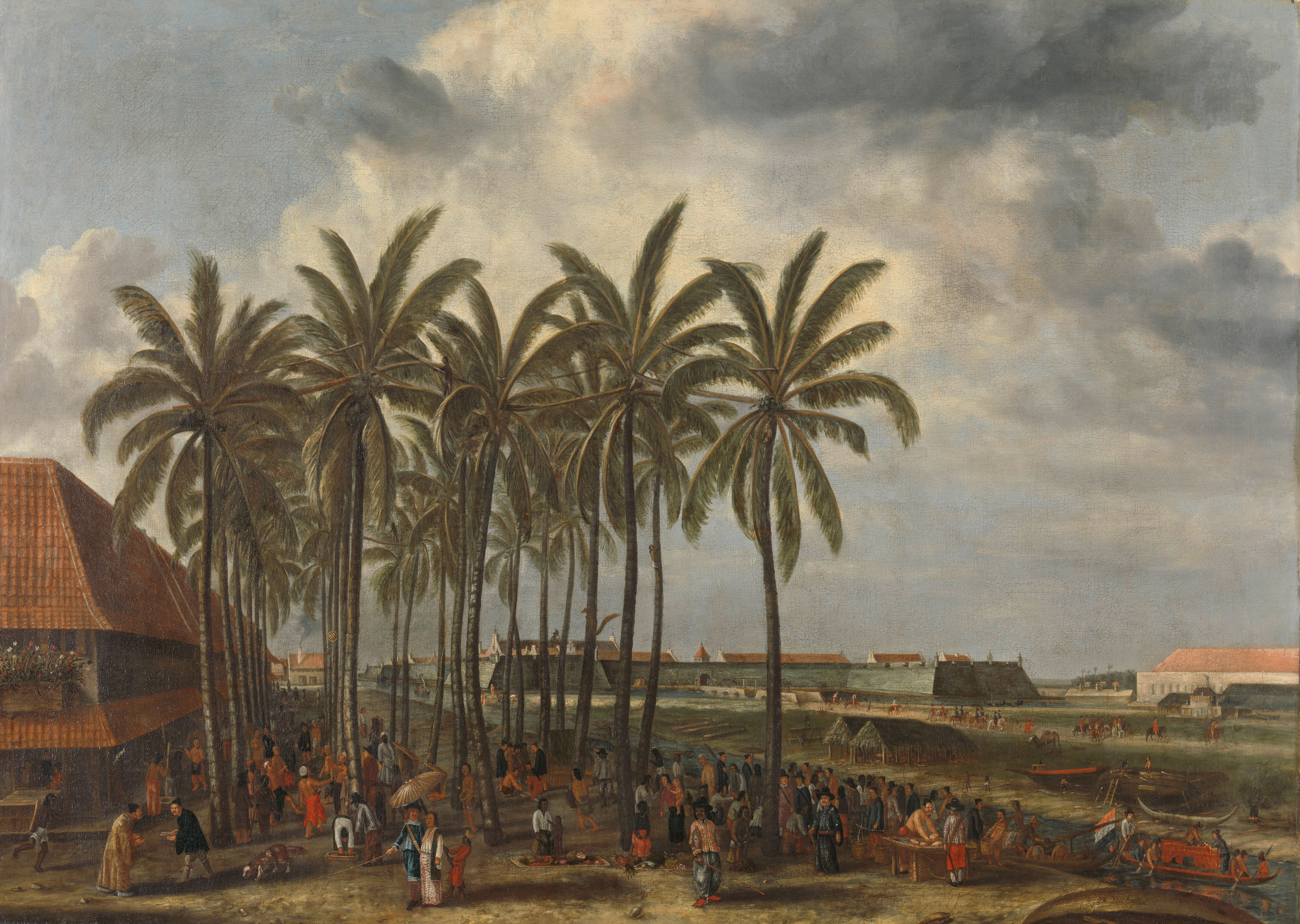
Dutch settlement in the East Indies. Batavia (now Jakarta), Java, c. 1665 CE.

Beginning in the 16th century, successive waves of Europeans—the Portuguese, Spanish, Dutch and English—sought to dominate the spice trade at its sources in India and the 'Spice Islands' (Maluku; as referred to by Europeans) of Indonesia. This meant finding a way to Asia to cut out Muslim merchants who, with their Venetian outlet in the Mediterranean, monopolised spice imports to Europe. Astronomically priced at the time, spices were highly coveted not only to preserve and make poorly preserved meat palatable, but also as medicines and magic potions.

=== The Portuguese ===
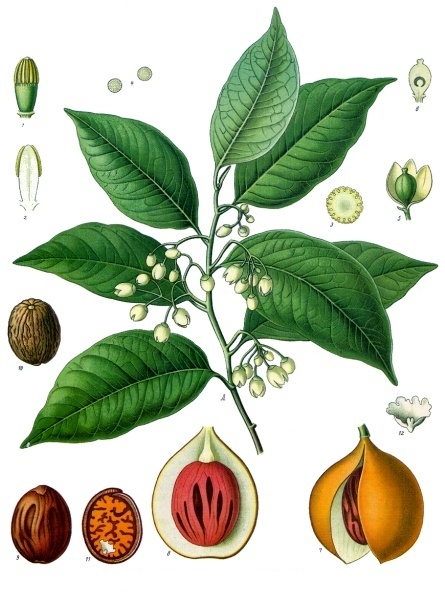
The nutmeg plant is native to Indonesia's Banda Islands. Once one of the world's most valuable commodities, it drew the first European colonial powers to Indonesia.

Newfound Portuguese expertise in navigation, shipbuilding and weaponry allowed them to make daring expeditions of exploration and expansion. Starting with the first exploratory expeditions sent from newly conquered Malacca in 1512, the Portuguese were the first Europeans to arrive in Indonesia, and sought to dominate the sources of valuable spices and to extend the Catholic Church's missionary efforts. The Portuguese turned east to Maluku and through both military conquest and alliance with local rulers, they established trading posts, forts, and missions on the islands of Ternate, Ambon, and Solor among others. The height of Portuguese missionary activities, however, came in the latter half of the 16th century. Ultimately, the Portuguese presence in Indonesia was reduced to Solor, Flores and Timor in modern-day Nusa Tenggara, following defeat at the hands of indigenous Ternateans and the Dutch in Maluku, and a general failure to maintain control of trade in the region. In comparison with the original Portuguese ambition to dominate Asian trade, their influence on Indonesian culture was small: the romantic keroncong guitar ballads; a number of Indonesian words which reflect Portuguese's role as the lingua franca of the archipelago alongside Malay; and many family names in eastern Indonesia such as da Costa, Dias, de Fretes, Gonsalves, etc. The most significant impacts of the Portuguese arrival were the disruption and disorganisation of the trade network mostly as a result of their conquest of Malacca, and the first significant plantings of Christianity in Indonesia. There have continued to be Christian communities in eastern Indonesia through to the present, which has contributed to a sense of shared interest with Europeans, particularly among the Ambonese.

=== Dutch East India Company ===
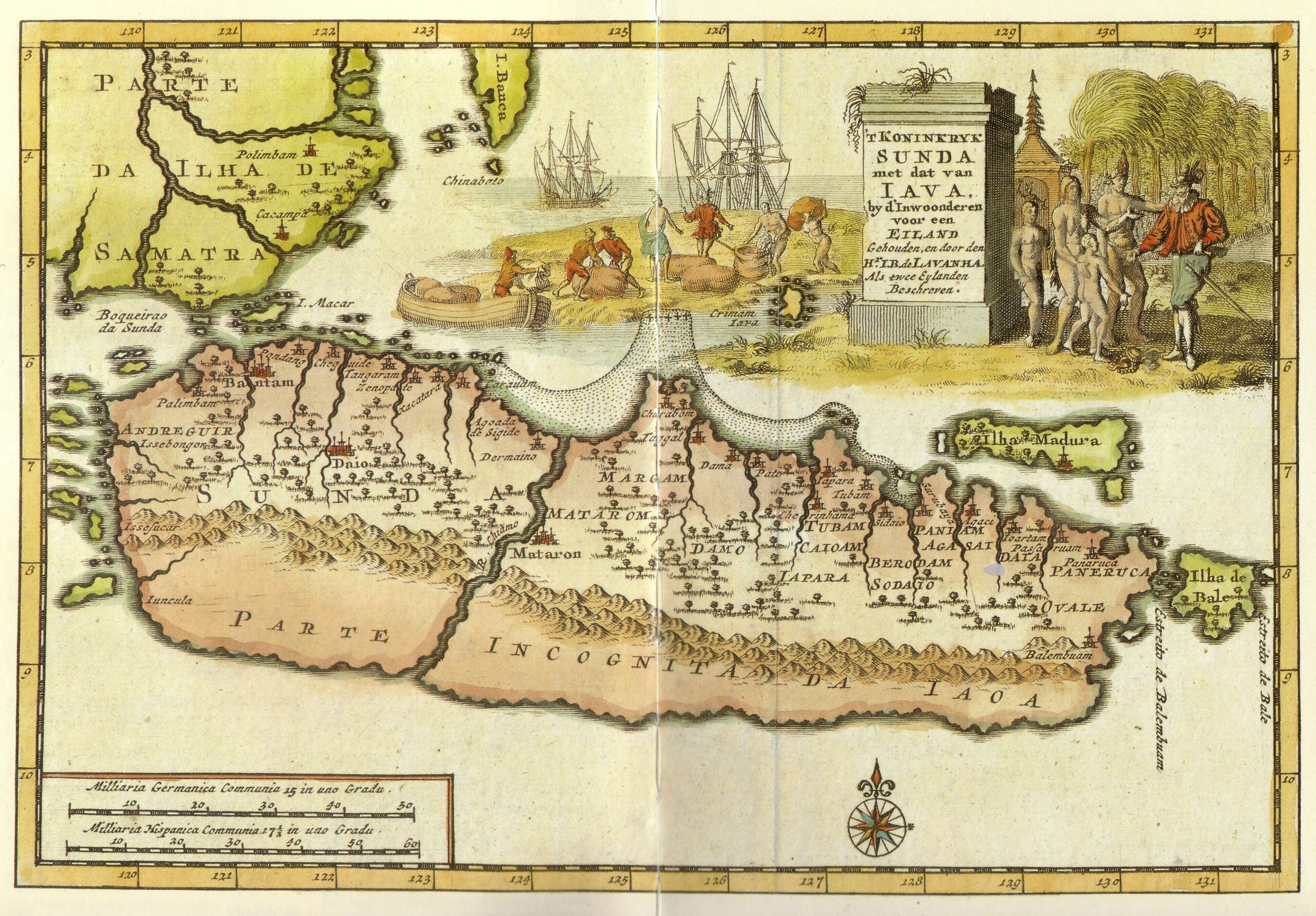
An early 18th-century Dutch map from a time when only the north coastal ports of Java were well known to the Dutch

In 1602, the Dutch parliament awarded the VOC a monopoly on trade and colonial activities in the region at a time before the company controlled any territory in Java. In 1619, the VOC conquered the West Javan city of Jayakarta, where they founded the city of Batavia (present-day Jakarta). The VOC became deeply involved in the internal politics of Java in this period, and fought in a number of wars involving the leaders of Mataram and Banten.

The Dutch followed the Portuguese aspirations, courage, brutality, and strategies but brought better organisation, weapons, ships, and superior financial backing. Although they failed to gain complete control of the Indonesian spice trade, they had much more success than the previous Portuguese efforts. They exploited the factionalisation of the small kingdoms in Java that had replaced Majapahit, establishing a permanent foothold in Java, from which grew a land-based colonial empire which became one of the richest colonial possessions on earth.

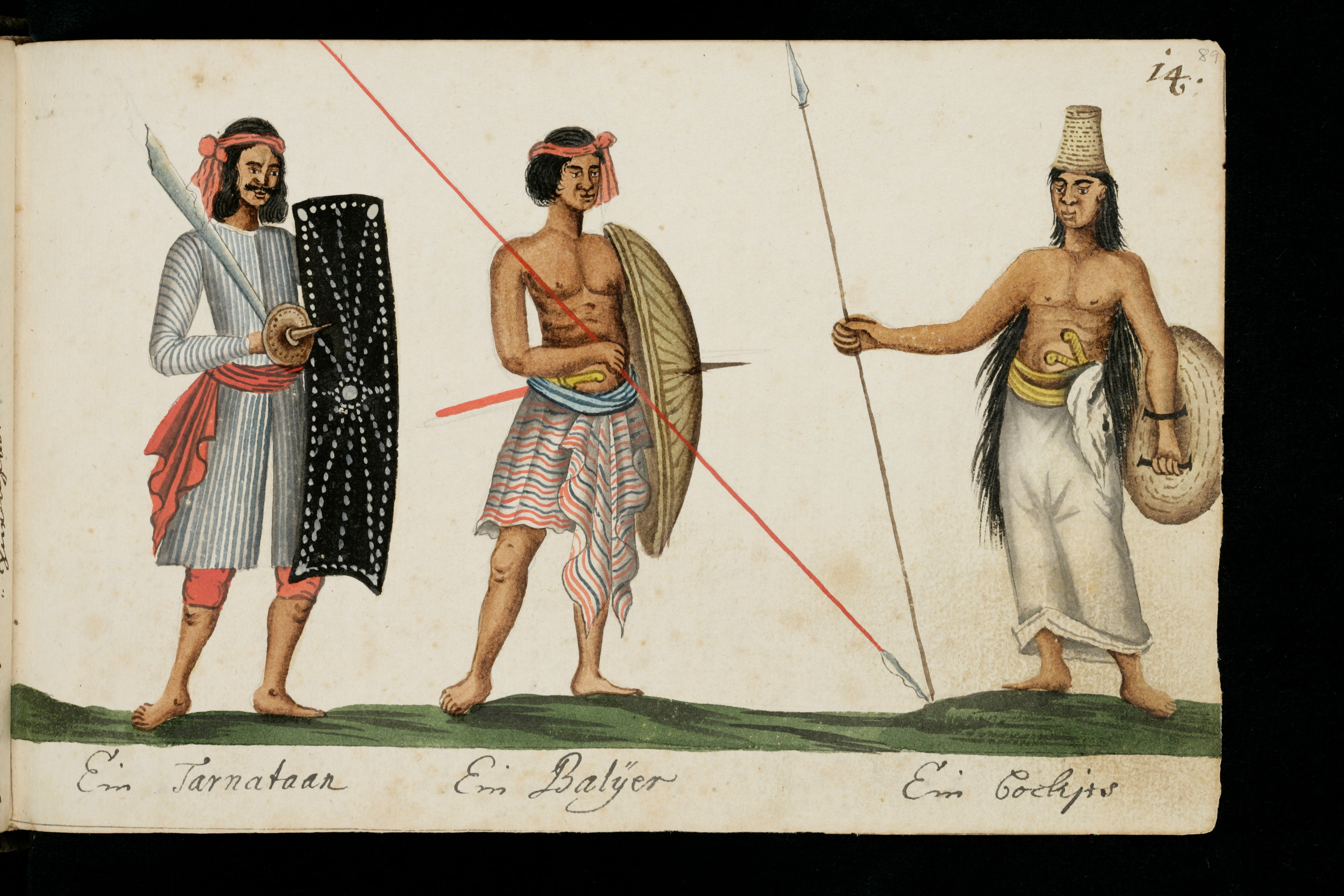
From left to right: Ternate, Bali and Bugis soldiers, European illustration from the 17th century

By the mid-17th century, Batavia, the headquarter of VOC in Asia, had become an important trade centre in the region. It had repelled attacks from the Javanese Mataram kingdom. In 1641, the Dutch captured Malacca from the Portuguese, thus weakened Portuguese position in Asia. The Dutch defeated the Sulawesi city of Makassar in 1667 thus bringing its trade under VOC control. Sumatran ports were also brought under VOC control and the last of the Portuguese were expelled in 1660. In return for monopoly control over the pepper trade and the expulsion of the English, the Dutch helped the son of the ruler of Banten overthrow his father in 1680. By the 18th century, the VOC has established themselves firmly in Indonesian archipelago, controlling inter-island trade as part of their Asian business which includes India, Ceylon, Formosa, and Japan. VOC has established their important bases in some ports in Java, Maluku, and parts of Sulawesi, Sumatra, and Malay Peninsula.

=== French and British interlude ===
The Java Great Post Road, commissioned by Daendels

After the fall of the Netherlands to the First French Empire and the dissolution of the Dutch East India Company in 1800, there were profound changes in the European colonial administration of the East Indies. The company's assets in East Indies were nationalised as the Dutch colony, the Dutch East Indies. Meanwhile, Europe was devastated by the Napoleonic Wars. In the Netherlands, Napoleon Bonaparte in 1806 oversaw the dissolution of the Batavian Republic, which was replaced by the Kingdom of Holland, a French puppet kingdom ruled by Napoleon's third brother Louis Bonaparte (Lodewijk Napoleon). The East Indies were treated as a proxy French colony, administered through a Dutch intermediary.

In 1806, King Lodewijk of the Netherlands sent one of his generals, Herman Willem Daendels, to serve as governor-general of the East Indies, based in Java. Daendels was sent to strengthen Javanese defences against a predicted British invasion. Since 1685, the British had had a presence in Bencoolen on the western coast of Sumatra, as well as several posts north of the Malaccan straits. Daendels was responsible for the construction of the Great Post Road (Indonesian: Jalan Raya Pos) across northern Java from Anjer to Panaroecan. The thousand-kilometre road was meant as to ease logistics across Java and was completed in only one year, during which thousands of Javanese forced labourers died. In 1811, Java was captured by the British, becoming a possession of the British Empire, and Thomas Stamford Raffles was appointed as the island's governor. Raffles launched several military expeditions against local Javanese princes; such as the assault on Yogyakarta kraton on 21 June 1812, and the military expedition against Sultan Mahmud Badaruddin II of Palembang, along with giving orders to seize the nearby Bangka Island. During his administration, numbers of ancient monuments in Java were rediscovered, excavated and systematically catalogued for the first time, the most important one being the rediscovery of Borobudur Buddhist temple in Central Java. Raffles was an enthusiast of the island's history, as he wrote the book The History of Java published later in 1817. In 1816, under the administration of British governor John Fendall, Java was returned to control of the Netherlands as per the terms of the Anglo-Dutch Treaty of 1814.

=== Dutch state rule ===
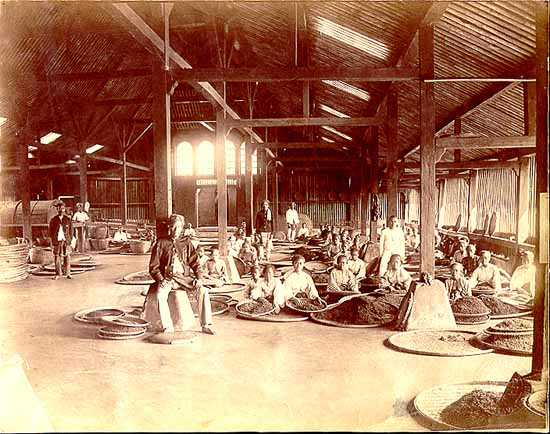
Batavian (Jakarta) tea factory in the 1860s

After the VOC was dissolved in 1800 following bankruptcy, and after the end of British rule under Raffles' governorship, the Dutch state took over the VOC possessions in 1816. A Javanese uprising was crushed in the Java War of 1825–1830. After 1830, a system of forced cultivations and indentured labour was introduced on Java, the Cultivation System (in Dutch: cultuurstelsel). This system brought the Dutch and their Indonesian allies enormous wealth. The cultivation system tied peasants to their land, forcing them to work in government-owned plantations for 60 days of the year. The system was abolished in a more liberal period after 1870. In 1901, the Dutch adopted what they called the Ethical Policy, which included somewhat increased investment in indigenous education, and modest political reforms.

Modeling the former successes of the VOC's former opium monopoly in the islands, and after a series of Opiumpacht, the Netherlands established the Opiumregie (Opium Monopoly), which began operations in Batavia in 1898. In 1934, this was merged with the Zoutregie to become the Opium-en-zoutregie (Opium and Salt Monopoly). The Opiumregie and the Opium-en-zootregie were the only legally authorized entities in the Dutch East Indies to sell opium, and they were also mandated with the enforcement powers to imprison any private party that sold opium, cocaine, or heroin in the islands. The Opiumregie managed a large police force, narcotics officers, and naval vessels to arrest anyone who consumed these drugs in districts where they were forbidden. The monopoly over opium was so resolute, that it was the impetus for the Dutch intervention in Bali. The government made millions selling opium. This monopoly did not stop until the Japanese invasion of Indonesia.

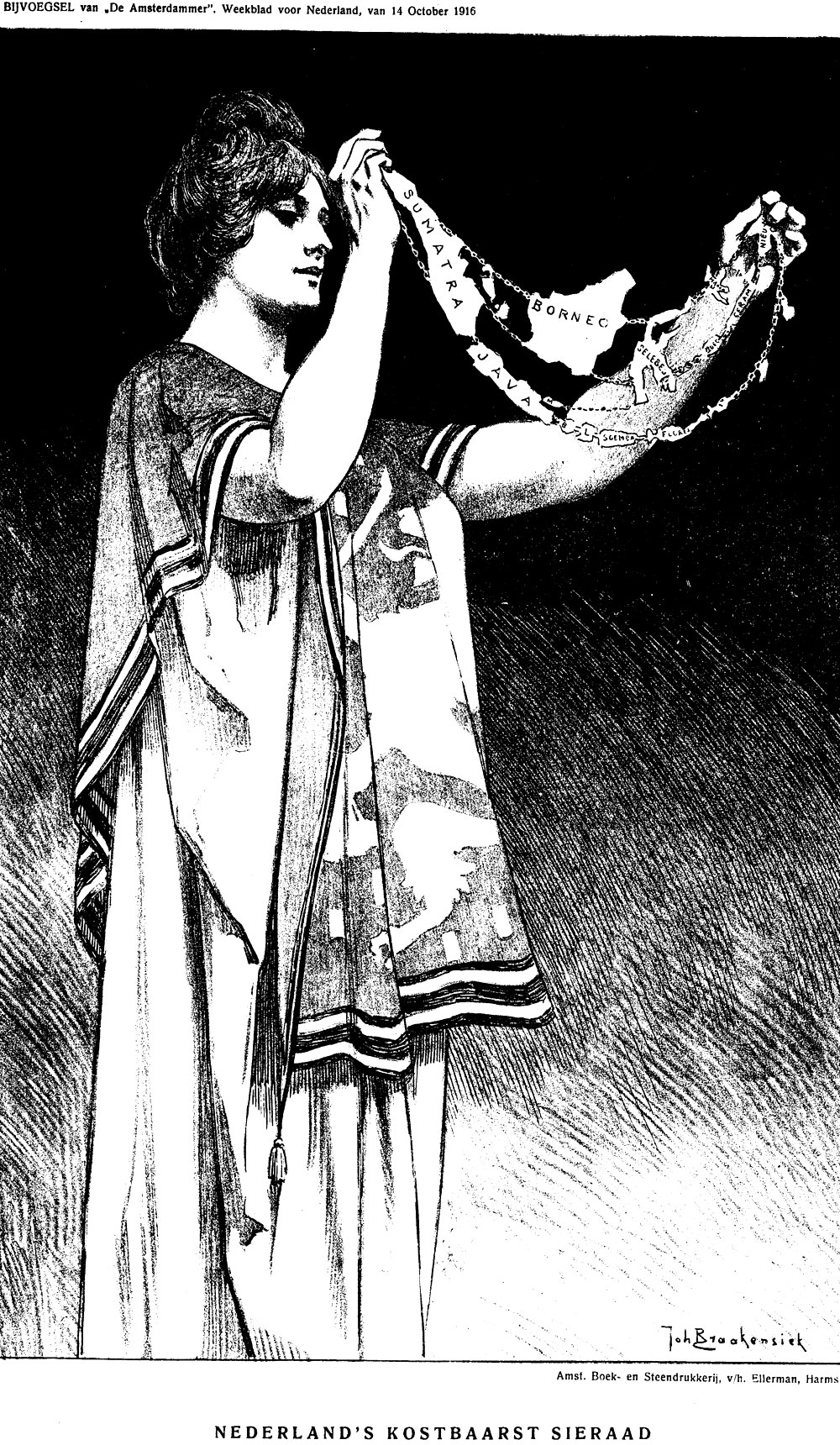
Dutch imperial painting depicting the Dutch East Indies as "our most precious gem" (1916)

The Dutch colonials formed a privileged upper social class of soldiers, administrators, managers, teachers, and pioneers. They lived together with the "natives", but at the top of a rigid social and racial caste system. The Dutch East Indies had two legal classes of citizens; European and indigenous. A third class, Foreign Easterners, was added in 1920.

Upgrading the infrastructure of ports and roads was a high priority for the Dutch, with the goal of modernising the economy, pumping wages into local areas, facilitating commerce, and speeding up military movements. By 1950, Dutch engineers had built and upgraded a road network with 12,000 km of asphalted surface, 41,000 km of metalled road area and 16,000 km of gravel surfaces. In addition the Dutch built 7,500 kilometres (4,700 mi) of railways, bridges, irrigation systems covering 1.4 million hectares (5,400 sq mi) of rice fields, several harbours, and 140 public drinking water systems. These Dutch constructed public works became the economic base of the colonial state; after independence, they became the basis of the Indonesian infrastructure.

For most of the colonial period, Dutch control over its territories in the Indonesian archipelago was tenuous. In some cases, Dutch police and military actions in parts of Indonesia were quite cruel. Recent discussions, for example, of Dutch cruelty in Aceh have encouraged renewed research on these aspects of Dutch rule. It was only in the early 20th century, three centuries after the first Dutch trading post, that the full extent of the colonial territory was established and direct colonial rule exerted across what would become the boundaries of the modern Indonesian state. Portuguese Timor, now East Timor, remained under Portuguese rule until 1975 when it was invaded by Indonesia. The Indonesian government declared the territory an Indonesian province but relinquished it in 1999.

== Emergence of Indonesia ==
=== Indonesian National Awakening ===
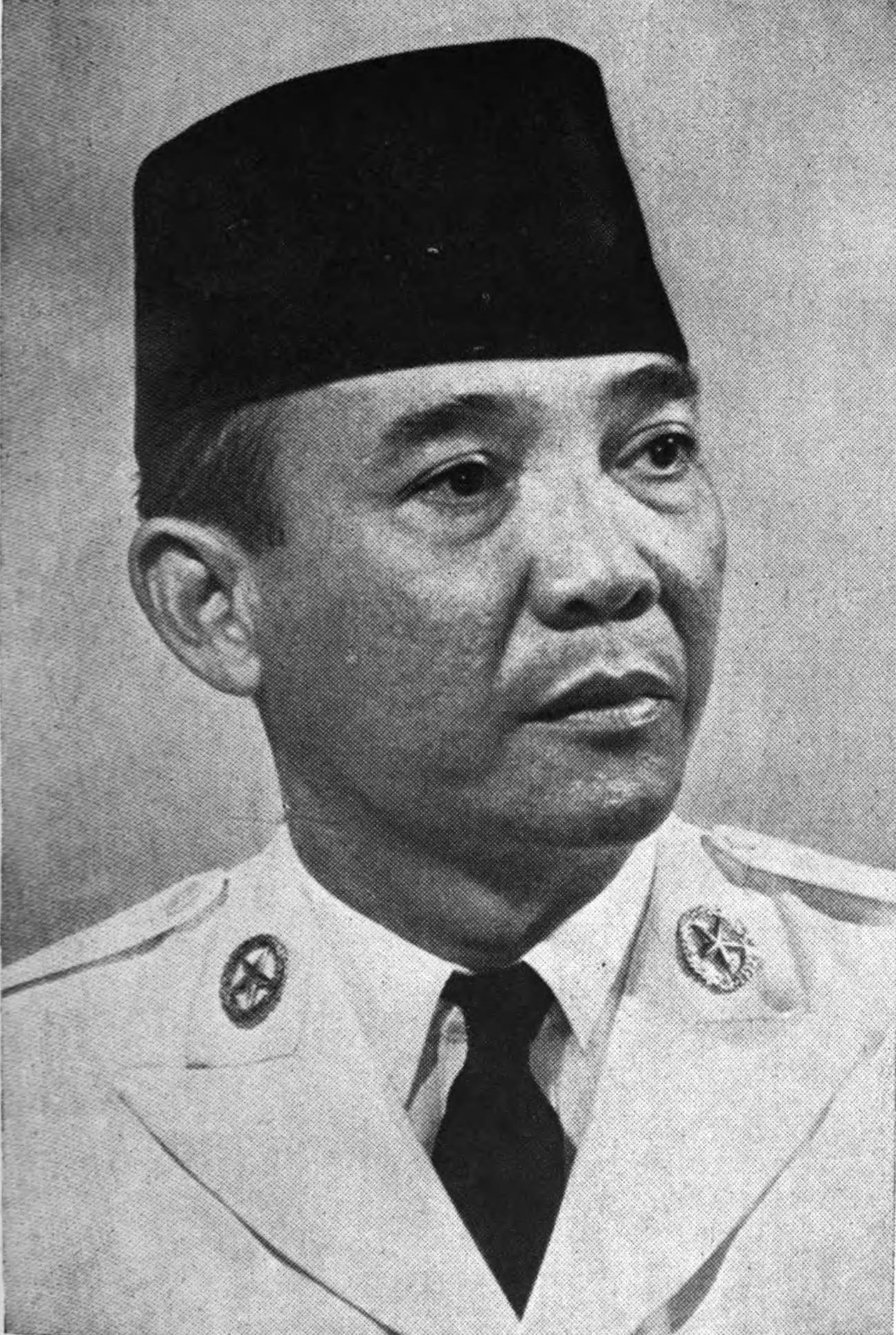
Sukarno, Indonesian Nationalist leader, and later, first president of Indonesia

In October 1908, the first nationalist movement was formed, Budi Utomo. On 10 September 1912, the first nationalist mass movement was formed: Sarekat Islam. By December 1912, Sarekat Islam had 93,000 members. The Dutch responded after the First World War with repressive measures. The nationalist leaders came from a small group of young professionals and students, some of whom had been educated in the Netherlands. In the post–World War I era, the Indonesian communists who were associated with the Third International started to usurp the nationalist movement. The repression of the nationalist movement led to many arrests, including Indonesia's future first president, Sukarno (1901–70), who was imprisoned for political activities on 29 December 1929. Also arrested was Mohammad Hatta, first vice-president of Indonesia. Additionally, Sutan Sjahrir, who later became the first Prime Minister of Indonesia, was arrested on this date.

In 1914 the exiled Dutch socialist Henk Sneevliet founded the Indies Social Democratic Association. Initially a small forum of Dutch socialists, it would later evolve into the Communist Party of Indonesia (PKI) in 1924. In the post–World War I era, the Dutch strongly repressed all attempts at change. This repression led to a growth of the PKI. By December 1924, the PKI had a membership of 1,140. One year later in 1925, the PKI had grown to 3,000 members. From 1926 to 1927, there was a PKI-led revolt against Dutch colonialism and the harsh repression of strikes of urban workers. However, the strikes and the revolt were put down by the Dutch with some 13,000 nationalists and communists leaders arrested. Some 4,500 were given prison sentences.

Sukarno was released from prison in December 1931 but was re-arrested on 1 August 1933.

=== Japanese occupation ===
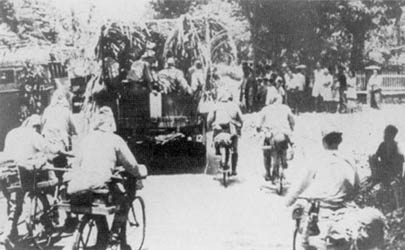
Japanese bicycle infantry move through Java during their occupation of the Dutch East Indies.

The Japanese invasion and subsequent occupation during World War II interrupted Dutch rule and encouraged the previously suppressed Indonesian independence movement. In May 1940, early in World War II, Nazi Germany occupied the Netherlands, but the Dutch government-in-exile initially continued to control the Dutch East Indies from its base in London. The Dutch East Indies declared a state of siege and in July 1940 redirected exports intended for Japan to the US and Britain. Negotiations with the Japanese aimed at securing supplies of aviation fuel collapsed in June 1941, and the Japanese started their conquest of Southeast Asia in December of that year. That same month, factions from Sumatra sought Japanese assistance for a revolt against the Dutch wartime government. The Japanese military defeated last Dutch forces in the East Indies in March 1942.

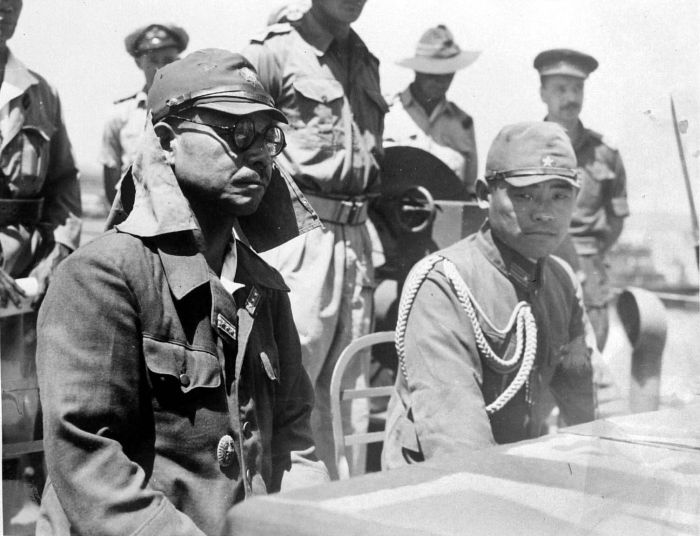
Japanese commanders in the Dutch East Indies during the surrender

In July 1942, Sukarno accepted Japan's offer to rally the public in support of the Japanese war effort. Sukarno and Mohammad Hatta were decorated by the Emperor of Japan in 1943. However, experience of the Japanese occupation of Dutch East Indies varied considerably, depending upon where one lived and one's social position. Many who lived in areas considered important to the war effort experienced torture, sex slavery, arbitrary arrest and execution, and other war crimes. Thousands taken away from Indonesia as war labourers (romusha) suffered or died as a result of ill-treatment and starvation. People of Dutch and mixed Dutch-Indonesian descent were particular targets of the Japanese occupation.

In March 1945, the Japanese established the Investigating Committee for Preparatory Work for Independence (BPUPK) as the initial stage of the establishment of independence for the area under the control of the Japanese 16th Army. At its first meeting in May, Soepomo spoke of national integration and against personal individualism, while Muhammad Yamin suggested that the new nation should claim British Borneo, British Malaya, Portuguese Timor, and all the pre-war territories of the Dutch East Indies. The committee drafted the 1945 Constitution, which remains in force, though now much amended. On 9 August 1945 Sukarno, Hatta, and Radjiman Wediodiningrat were flown to meet Marshal Hisaichi Terauchi in Vietnam. They were told that Japan intended to announce Indonesian independence on 24 August. After the Japanese surrender, however, Sukarno unilaterally proclaimed Indonesian independence on 17 August. A later UN report stated that four million people died in Indonesia as a result of the Japanese occupation.

=== Indonesian National Revolution ===
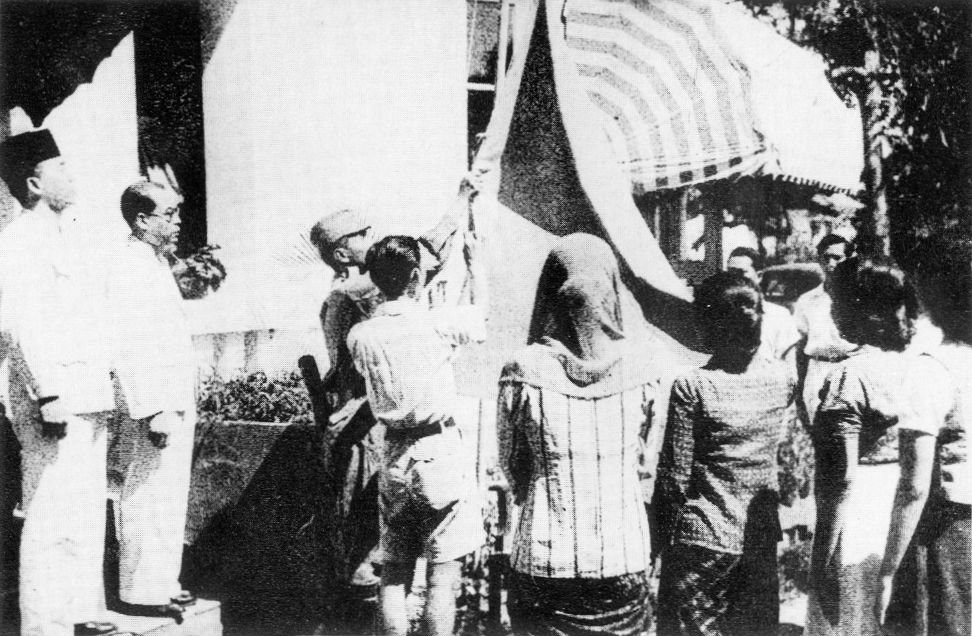
Indonesian flag raising shortly after the declaration of independence

Under pressure from radical and politicised pemuda ('youth') groups, Sukarno and Hatta on behalf of the Nation proclaimed Indonesian independence on 17 August 1945 from colonialism by foreign nations two days after the Japanese Emperor's surrender in the Pacific, and made this nation an independent state, which has the right to govern its people and nation in accordance with the philosophy, character and spirit of the Indonesia nation itself. The following day, the Central Indonesian National Committee (KNIP) declared Sukarno President and Hatta Vice-President. Word of the proclamation spread by shortwave and fliers while the Indonesian war-time military (PETA), youths, and others rallied in support of the new republic, often moving to take over government offices from the Japanese. In December 1946 the United Nations acknowledged that Netherlands had advised the United Nations that the "Netherlands Indies" was a non-self-governing territory (colony) for which the Netherlands had a legal duty to make yearly reports and to assist towards "a full measure of self-government" as required by the Charter of the United Nations article 73.

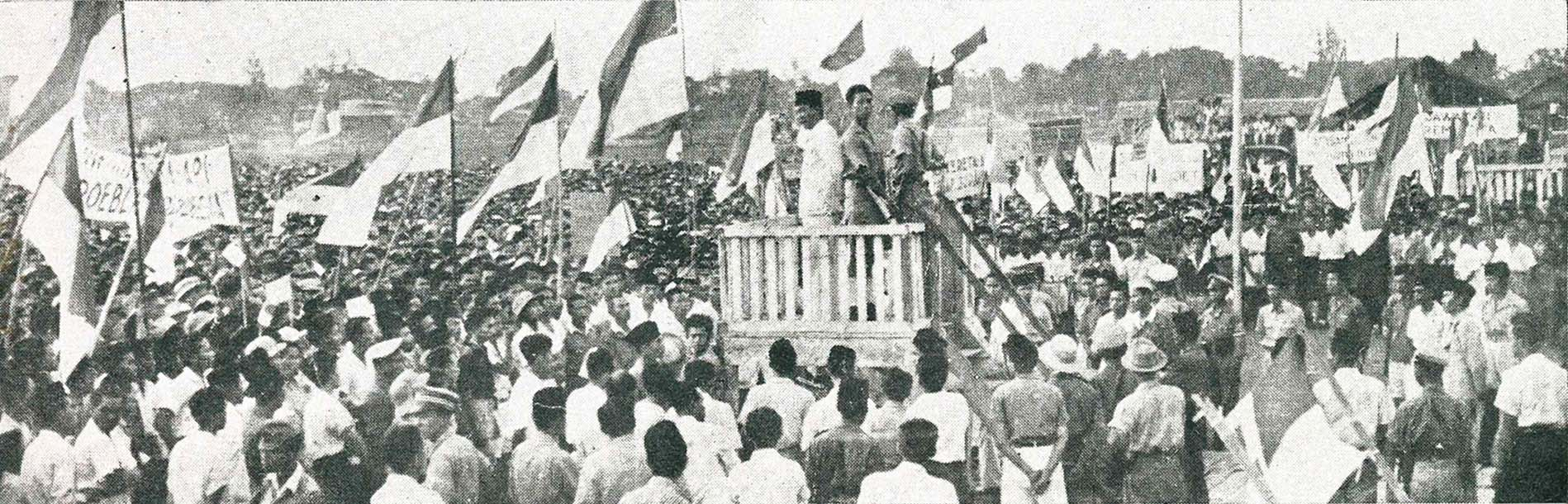
Sukarno speaking at the Rapat Akbar (grand meeting) on 19 September 1945

The Dutch, initially backed by the British, tried to re-establish their rule, and a bitter armed and diplomatic struggle ended in December 1949, when in the face of international pressure, the Dutch formally recognised Indonesian independence. Dutch efforts to re-establish complete control met resistance. At the end of World War II, a power vacuum arose, and the nationalists often succeeded in seizing the arms of the demoralised Japanese. A period of unrest with city guerrilla warfare called the Bersiap period ensued. Groups of Indonesian nationalists armed with improvised weapons (like bamboo spears) and firearms attacked returning Allied troops. 3,500 Europeans were killed and 20,000 were missing, meaning there were more European deaths in Indonesia after the war than during the war. After returning to Java, Dutch forces quickly re-occupied the colonial capital of Batavia (now Jakarta), so the city of Yogyakarta in central Java became the capital of the nationalist forces. Negotiations with the nationalists led to two major truce agreements, but disputes about their implementation, and much mutual provocation, led each time to renewed conflict. Within four years the Dutch had recaptured almost the whole of Indonesia, but guerrilla resistance persisted, led on Java by commander Nasution. On 27 December 1949, after four years of sporadic warfare and fierce criticism of the Dutch by the UN, the Netherlands officially recognised Indonesian sovereignty under the federal structure of the United States of Indonesia (RUSI). With the unification of all the kingdoms in the archipelago on 17 August 1950, exactly five years after the proclamation of independence, the last of the federal states were dissolved and Sukarno proclaimed a single unitary Republic of Indonesia until now.

== Sukarno's presidency ==
=== Democratic experiment ===
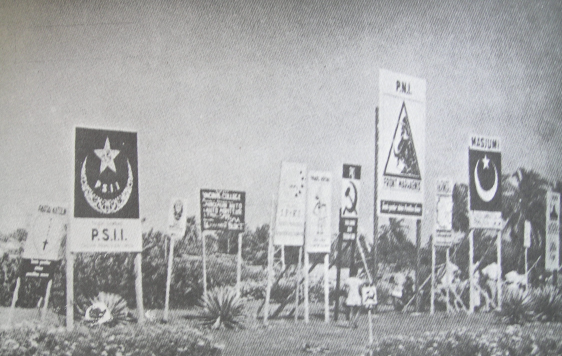
Campaign posters for the 1955 Indonesian election

With the unifying struggle to secure Indonesia's independence over, divisions in Indonesian society began to appear. These included regional differences in customs, religion, the impact of Christianity and Marxism, and fears of Javanese political domination. Following colonial rule, Japanese occupation, and war against the Dutch, the new country suffered from severe poverty, a ruinous economy, low educational and skills levels, and authoritarian traditions. Challenges to the authority of the Republic included the militant Darul Islam who waged a guerrilla struggle against the Republic from 1948 to 1962; the declaration of an independent Republic of South Maluku by Ambonese formerly of the Royal Dutch Indies Army; and rebellions in Sumatra and Sulawesi between 1955 and 1961.

In contrast to the 1945 Constitution, the 1950 constitution mandated a parliamentary system of government, an executive responsible to parliament, and stipulated at length constitutional guarantees for human rights, drawing heavily on the 1948 United Nations Universal Declaration of Human Rights. A proliferation of political parties dealing for shares of cabinet seats resulted in a rapid turnover of coalition governments including 17 cabinets between 1945 and 1958. The long-postponed parliamentary elections were held in 1955; although the Indonesian National Party (PNI)—considered Sukarno's party—topped the poll, and the Communist Party of Indonesia (PKI) received strong support, no party garnered more than a quarter of the votes, which resulted in short-lived coalitions.

=== Guided Democracy ===
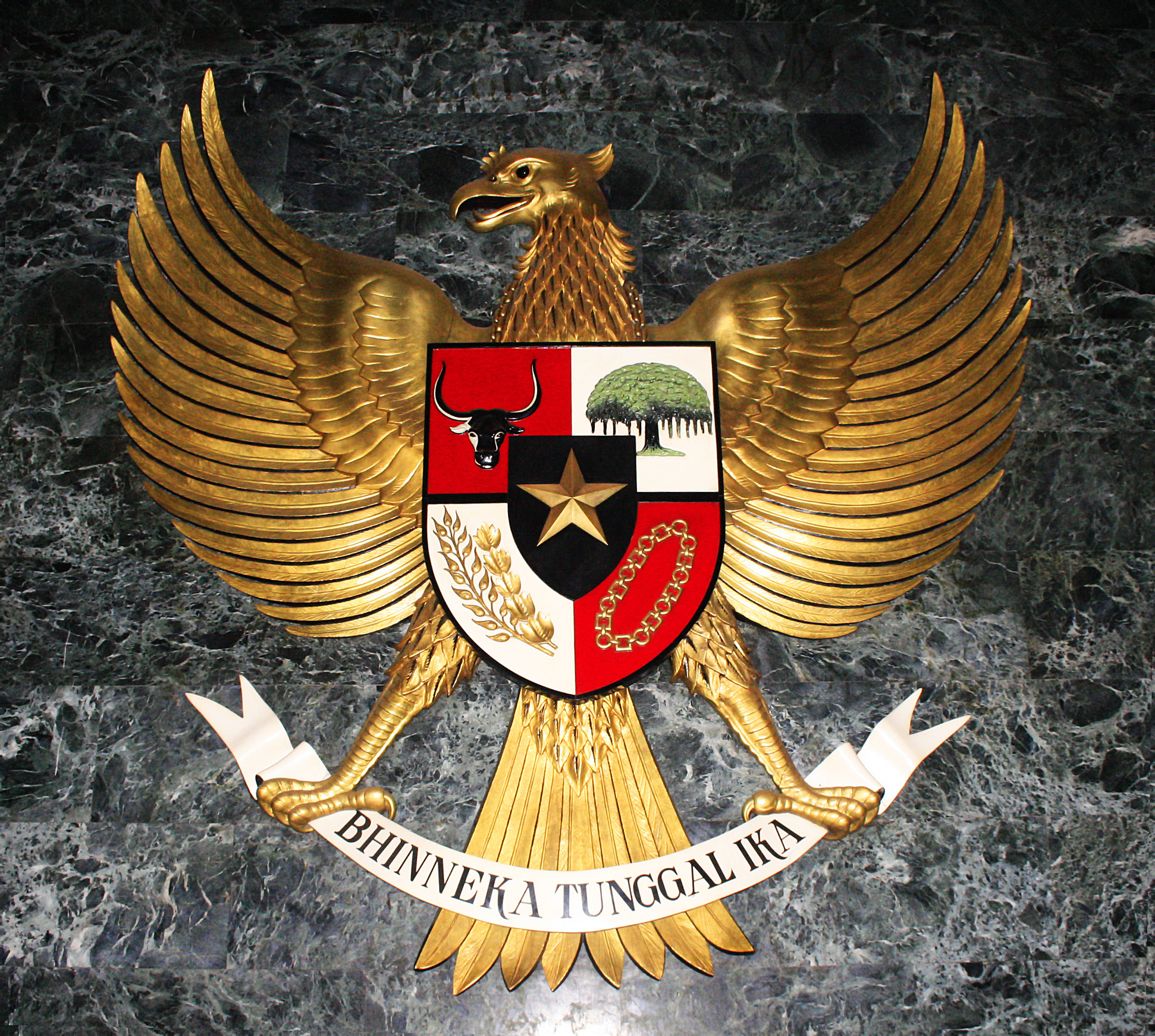
National emblem of the Republic of Indonesia, adopted in 1950

By 1956, Sukarno was openly criticising parliamentary democracy, stating that it was "based upon inherent conflict" which ran counter to Indonesian notions of harmony as being the natural state of human relationships. Instead, he sought a system based on the traditional village system of discussion and consensus, under the guidance of village elders. He proposed a threefold blend of nasionalisme ('nationalism'), agama ('religion'), and komunisme ('communism') into a co-operative 'Nas-A-Kom' government. This was intended to appease the three main factions in Indonesian politics — the army, Islamic groups, and the communists. With the support of the military, he proclaimed in February 1957 a system of 'Guided Democracy', and proposed a cabinet representing all the political parties of importance (including the PKI). The US tried and failed to secretly overthrow the president, even though Secretary of State Dulles declared before Congress that "we are not interested in the internal affairs of this country."

Sukarno abrogated the 1950 Constitution on 9 July 1959 by a decree dissolving the Constitutional Assembly and restoring the 1945 Constitution. The elected parliament was replaced by one appointed by, and subject to the will of, the president. This dissolution of the constitutional assembly caused Sukarno to ban the Masyumi Party in August 1960. Another non-elected body, the Supreme Advisory Council, was the main policy development body, while the National Front was set up in September 1960 and presided over by the president to "mobilise the revolutionary forces of the people". Western-style parliamentary democracy was thus finished in Indonesia until the 1999 elections of the Reformasi era.

=== Sukarno's revolution and nationalism ===
Charismatic Sukarno spoke as a romantic revolutionary, and under his increasingly authoritarian rule, Indonesia moved on a course of stormy nationalism. Sukarno was popularly referred to as bung ("older brother"), and he painted himself as a man of the people carrying the aspirations of Indonesia and one who dared take on the West. He instigated a number of large, ideologically driven infrastructure projects and monuments celebrating Indonesia's identity, which were criticised as substitutes for real development in a deteriorating economy. More positively, various reforms in health, education and working conditions were carried out during Sukarno's presidency.

Western New Guinea had been part of the Dutch East Indies, and Indonesian nationalists had thus claimed it on this basis. Indonesia was able to instigate a diplomatic and military confrontation with the Dutch over the territory following an Indonesian-Soviet arms agreement in 1960. It was, however, United States pressure on the Netherlands that led to an Indonesian takeover in 1963. Also in 1963, Indonesia commenced Konfrontasi with the new state of Malaysia. The northern states of Borneo, formerly British Sarawak and Sabah, had wavered in joining Malaysia, whilst Indonesia saw itself as the rightful ruler of Austronesian peoples and supported an unsuccessful revolution attempt in Brunei. Reviving the glories of the Indonesian National Revolution, Sukarno increased the anti-British sentiment in his rhetoric and mounted military offensives along the Indonesia-Malaysia border in Borneo. As the PKI rallied in Jakarta streets in support, the West became increasingly alarmed at Indonesian foreign policy and the United States withdrew its aid to Indonesia.

Indonesia's economic position deteriorated under Sukarno; by the mid-1960s, the cash-strapped government had to scrap critical public sector subsidies, inflation was at 1,000%, export revenues were shrinking, infrastructure crumbling, and factories were operating at minimal capacity with negligible investment. Severe poverty and hunger were widespread.

== New Order ==
=== Transition to the New Order ===
During the mid-20th century. It was the largest non-ruling communist party in the world before its eradication in 1965 and ban the following year.

Described as the great dalang ("puppet master"), Sukarno's position depended on balancing the opposing and increasingly hostile forces of the army and the PKI. Sukarno's anti-imperialist ideology saw Indonesia increasingly dependent on Soviet and then communist China. By 1965, the PKI was the largest communist party in the world outside the Soviet Union or China. Penetrating all levels of government, the party increasingly gained influence at the expense of the army.

On 30 September 1965, six of the most senior generals within the military and other officers were assassinated in an attempted coup. The insurgents, known later as the 30 September Movement, backed a rival faction of the army and took up positions in the capital, later seizing control of the national radio station. They claimed they were acting against a plot organised by the generals to overthrow Sukarno. Within a few hours, Major General Suharto, commander of the Army Strategic Reserve (Kostrad), mobilised counteraction, and by the evening of 1 October, it was clear that the coup, which had little co-ordination and was largely limited to Jakarta, had failed. Complicated and partisan theories continue to this day over the identity of the attempted coup's organisers and their aims. According to the Indonesian army, the PKI were behind the coup and used disgruntled army officers to carry it out, and this became the official account of Suharto's subsequent New Order administration.

The PKI was blamed for the coup, and anti-communists, initially following the army's lead, went on a violent anti-communist purge across much of the country. The PKI was effectively destroyed, and the most widely accepted estimates are that between 500,000 and 1 million were killed. The violence was especially brutal in Java and Bali. The PKI was outlawed and possibly more than 1 million of its leaders and affiliates were imprisoned. The United States and other Western powers facilitated and supported the purge, including with the American Central Intelligence Agency and the United Kingdom's MI6.

Throughout the 1965–66 period, President Sukarno attempted to restore his political position and shift the country back to its pre-October 1965 position but his Guided Democracy balancing act was destroyed with the PKI's demise. Although he remained president, the weakened Sukarno was forced to transfer key political and military powers to General Suharto, who by that time had become head of the armed forces. In March 1967, the Provisional People's Consultative Assembly (MPRS) named General Suharto acting president. Suharto was formally appointed president in March 1968. Sukarno lived under virtual house arrest until his death in 1970.

=== Consolidation of the New Order ===
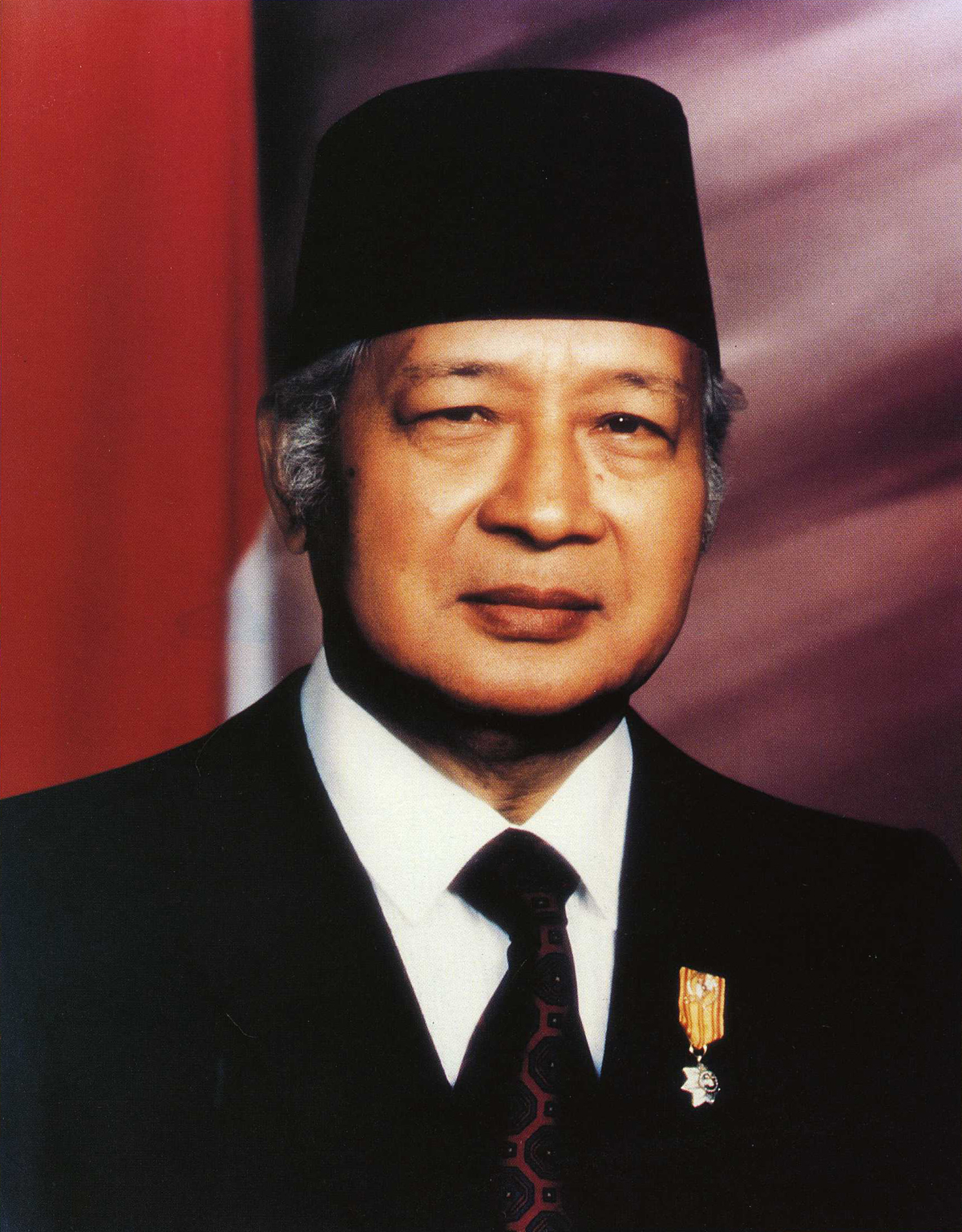
Suharto was the military president of Indonesia from 1967 to 1998. His regime was marked by corruption, human rights abuses, and authoritarian rule.

In the aftermath of Suharto's rise, hundreds of thousands of people were killed or imprisoned by the military and religious groups in a backlash against alleged communist supporters, with direct support from the United States. Suharto's administration is commonly called the New Order era. Suharto invited major foreign investment, which produced substantial, if uneven, economic growth. However, Suharto enriched himself and his family through business dealings and widespread corruption.

=== Annexation of West Irian ===
At the time of independence, the Dutch retained control over the western half of New Guinea (also known as West Irian), and permitted steps towards self-government and a declaration of independence on 1 December 1961. After negotiations with the Dutch on the incorporation of the territory into Indonesia failed, an Indonesian paratroop invasion preceded armed clashes between Indonesian and Dutch troops in 1961 and 1962. In 1962 the United States pressured the Netherlands into secret talks with Indonesia which in August 1962 produced the New York Agreement, and Indonesia assumed administrative responsibility for West Irian on 1 May 1963.

Rejecting UN supervision, the Indonesian government under Suharto decided to settle the question of West Irian, the former Dutch New Guinea, in their favour. Rather than a referendum of all residents of West Irian as had been agreed under Sukarno, an 'Act of Free Choice' was conducted in 1969 in which 1,025 Papuan representatives of local councils were selected by the Indonesians. They were warned to vote in favour of Indonesian integration with the group unanimously voting for integration with Indonesia. A subsequent UN General Assembly resolution confirmed the transfer of sovereignty to Indonesia.

West Irian was renamed Irian Jaya ('glorious Irian') in 1973. Opposition to Indonesian administration of Irian Jaya (later known as Papua) gave rise to guerrilla activity in the years following Jakarta's assumption of control.

=== Annexation of East Timor ===
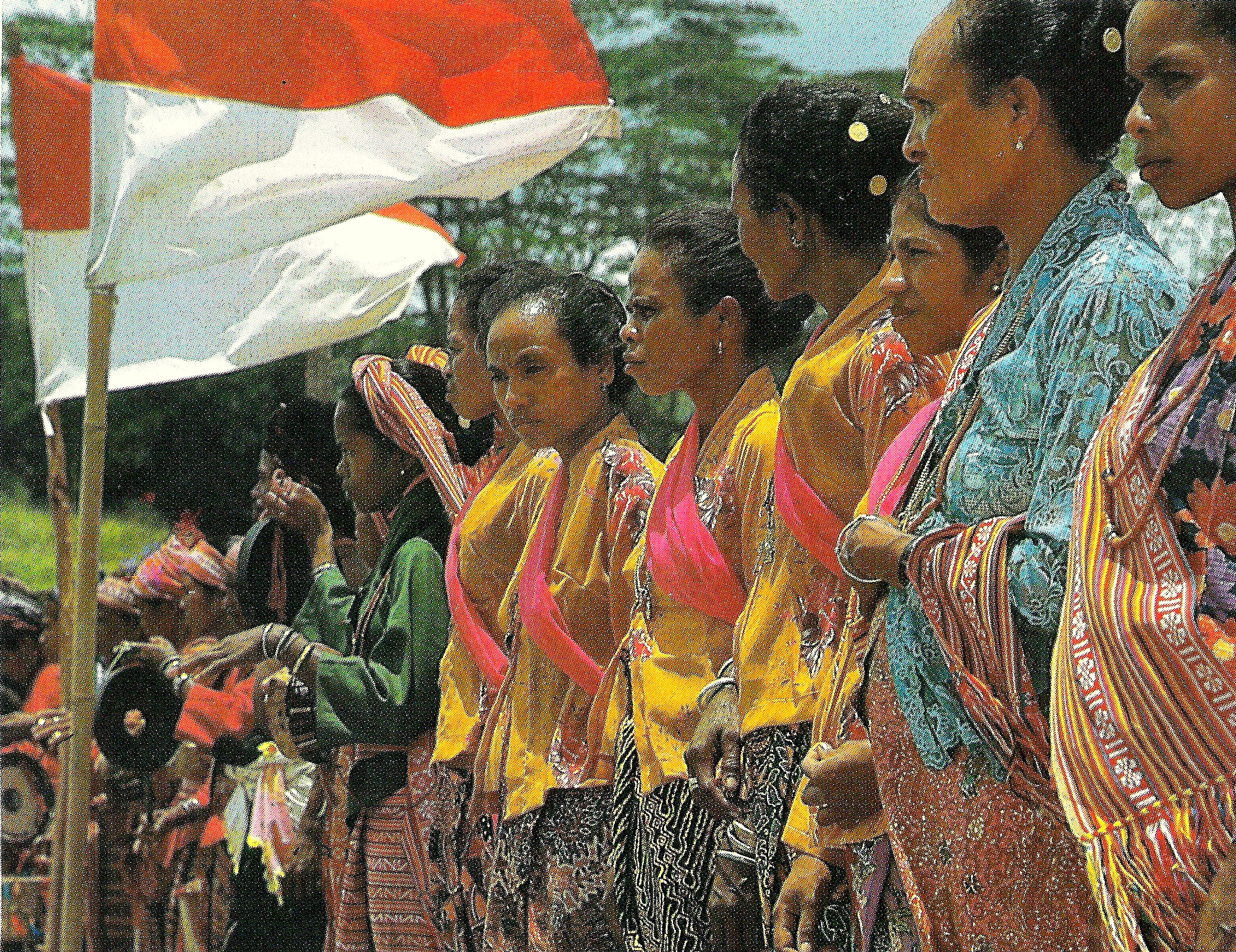
Timorese women with the Indonesian national flag

In 1975, the Carnation Revolution in Portugal caused authorities there to announce plans for decolonisation of Portuguese Timor, the eastern half of the island of Timor whose western half was a part of the Indonesian province of East Nusa Tenggara. In the East Timorese elections held in 1975, Fretilin, a left-leaning party, and UDT, aligned with the local elite, emerged as the largest parties, having previously formed an alliance to campaign for independence from Portugal. Apodeti, a party advocating integration with Indonesia, enjoyed little popular support.

Indonesia alleged that Fretilin was communist, and feared that an independent East Timor would influence separatism in the archipelago. Indonesian military intelligence influenced the break-up of the alliance between Fretilin and UDT, which led to a coup by the UDT on 11 August 1975 and the start of a month-long civil war. During this time, the Portuguese government effectively abandoned the territory and did not resume the decolonisation process. On 28 November, Fretilin unilaterally declared independence, and proclaimed the 'Democratic Republic of East Timor'. Nine days later, on 7 December, Indonesia invaded East Timor, eventually annexing the tiny country of (then) 680,000 people. Indonesia was supported materially and diplomatically by the United States, Australia, and the United Kingdom, who regarded Indonesia as an anti-communist ally.

Following the 1998 resignation of Suharto, the people of East Timor voted overwhelmingly for independence in a UN-sponsored referendum held on 30 August 1999. About 99% of the eligible population participated; more than three quarters chose independence despite months of attacks by the Indonesian military and its militia. After the result was announced, elements of the Indonesian military and its militia retaliated by killing approximately 2,000 East Timorese, displacing two-thirds of the population, raping hundreds of women and girls, and destroying much of the country's infrastructure. In October 1999, the Indonesian parliament (MPR) revoked the decree that annexed East Timor, and the United Nations Transitional Administration in East Timor (UNTAET) assumed responsibility for governing East Timor until it officially became an independent state in May 2002.

=== Transmigration ===
The Transmigration program (Transmigrasi) was a National Government initiative to move landless people from densely populated areas of Indonesia (such as Java and Bali) to less populous areas of the country including Papua, Kalimantan, Sumatra, and Sulawesi. The stated purpose of this program was to reduce the considerable poverty and overpopulation on Java, to provide opportunities for hard-working poor people, and to provide a workforce to better utilise the resources of the outer islands. The program, however, has been controversial, with critics accusing the Indonesian Government of trying to use these migrants to reduce the proportion of native populations in destination areas to weaken separatist movements. The program has often been cited as a major and ongoing factor in controversies and even conflict and violence between settlers and indigenous populations.

== Reform era ==
=== Pro-democracy movement ===
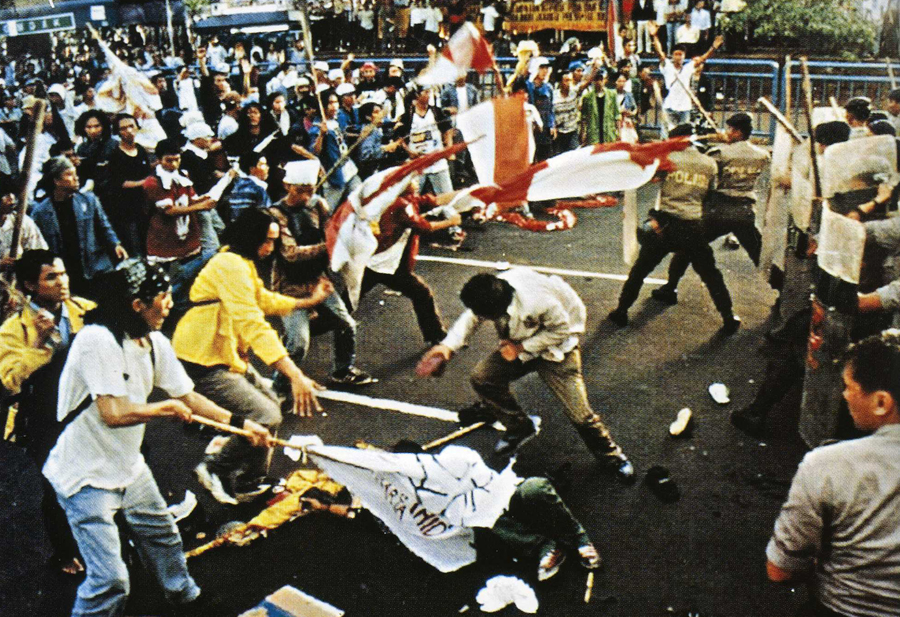
University students and police forces clash in May 1998

In 1996, Suharto undertook efforts to pre-empt a challenge to the New Order government. The Indonesian Democratic Party (PDI), a legal party that had traditionally propped up the regime, had changed direction and began to assert its independence. Suharto fostered a split over the leadership of PDI, backing a co-opted faction loyal to deputy speaker of the People's Representative Council Suryadi against a faction loyal to Megawati Sukarnoputri, the daughter of Sukarno and the PDI's chairperson.

After the Suryadi faction announced a party congress to sack Megawati would be held in Medan on 20–22 June, Megawati proclaimed that her supporters would hold demonstrations in protest. The Suryadi faction went through with its sacking of Megawati, and the demonstrations manifested themselves throughout Indonesia. This led to several confrontations on the streets between protesters and security forces, and recriminations over the violence. The protests culminated in the military allowing Megawati's supporters to take over PDI headquarters in Jakarta, with a pledge of no further demonstrations.

Suharto allowed the occupation of PDI headquarters to go on for almost a month, as attentions were also on Jakarta due to a set of high-profile ASEAN meetings scheduled to take place there. Capitalizing on this, Megawati supporters organised "democracy forums" with several speakers at the site. On 26 July, officers of the military, Suryadi, and Suharto openly aired their disgust with the forums.

On 27 July, police, soldiers, and persons claiming to be Suryadi supporters stormed the headquarters. Several Megawati supporters were killed, and over two hundred people were arrested and tried under the Anti-Subversion and Hate-Spreading laws. The day would become known as "Black Saturday" and mark the beginning of a renewed crackdown by the New Order government against supporters of democracy, now called the "Reformasi" or Reform movement.

=== Economic crisis and Suharto's resignation ===
In 1997 and 1998, Indonesia was the country hardest hit by the 1997 Asian financial crisis, which had dire consequences for the Indonesian economy and society, as well as Suharto's presidency. At the same time, the country suffered a severe drought and some of the largest forest fires in history burned in Kalimantan and Sumatra. The rupiah, the Indonesian currency, took a sharp dive in value. Suharto came under scrutiny from international lending institutions, chiefly the World Bank, International Monetary Fund (IMF) and the United States, over longtime embezzlement of funds and some protectionist policies. In December, Suharto's government signed a letter of intent to the IMF, pledging to enact austerity measures, including cuts to public services and removal of subsidies, in return for aid from the IMF and other donors. Prices for goods such as kerosene and rice, as well as fees for public services including education, rose dramatically. The effects were exacerbated by widespread corruption. The austerity measures approved by Suharto had started to erode domestic confidence with the New Order and led to popular protests.

Suharto stood for re-election by parliament for the seventh time in March 1998, justifying it on the grounds of the necessity of his leadership during the crisis. The parliament approved a new term. This sparked protests and riots throughout the country, now termed the Indonesian 1998 Revolution. Dissent within the ranks of his own Golkar party and the military finally weakened Suharto, and on 21 May he stood down from power. He was replaced by his deputy, Vice President B.J. Habibie.

President Habibie quickly assembled a cabinet. One of its main tasks was to re-establish International Monetary Fund and donor community support for an economic stabilisation program. He moved quickly to release political prisoners and lift some controls on freedom of speech and association. Elections for the national, provincial, and sub-provincial parliaments were held on 7 June 1999. In the elections for the national parliament, the Indonesian Democratic Party of Struggle (PDI-P, led by Sukarno's daughter Megawati Sukarnoputri) won 34% of the vote; Golkar (Suharto's party, formerly the only legal party of government) 22%; United Development Party (PPP, led by Hamzah Haz) 12%; and National Awakening Party (PKB, led by Abdurrahman Wahid) 10%.

=== May 1998 riots ===
The May 1998 riots of Indonesia also known as the 1998 tragedy or simply the 1998 event, were incidents of mass violence, demonstrations, and civil unrest of a racial nature that occurred throughout Indonesia.

=== Politics since 1999 ===
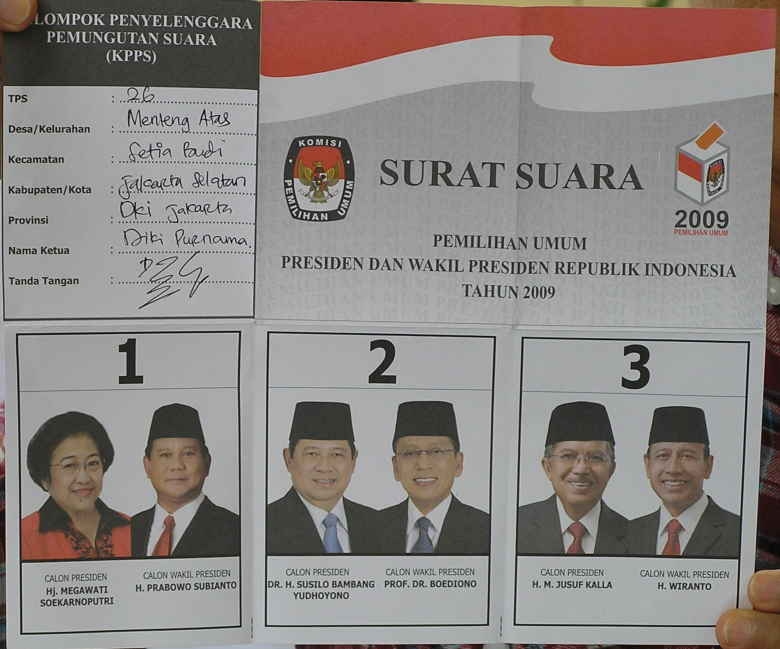
Indonesian 2009 election ballot. Since 2004, Indonesians are able to vote their president directly.

In October 1999, the People's Consultative Assembly (MPR), which consists of the 500-member Parliament plus 200 appointed members, elected Abdurrahman Wahid, commonly referred to as "Gus Dur", as President, and Megawati Sukarnoputri as Vice-President, both for five-year terms. Abdurrahman named his first Cabinet in early November 1999 and a reshuffled, second Cabinet in August 2000. President Abdurrahman's government continued to pursue democratisation and to encourage renewed economic growth under challenging conditions. In addition to continuing economic malaise, his government faced regional, interethnic, and interreligious conflict, particularly in Aceh, the Maluku Islands, and Irian Jaya. In West Timor, the problems of displaced East Timorese and violence by pro-Indonesian East Timorese militias caused considerable humanitarian and social problems. An increasingly assertive Parliament frequently challenged President Abdurrahman's policies and prerogatives, contributing to a lively and sometimes rancorous national political debate.

During the People's Consultative Assembly's first annual session in August 2000, President Abdurrahman gave an account of his government's performance. On 29 January 2001, thousands of student protesters stormed parliament grounds and demanded that President Abdurrahman Wahid resign due to alleged involvement in corruption scandals. Under pressure from the Assembly to improve management and co-ordination within the government, he issued a presidential decree giving Vice-President Megawati control over the day-to-day administration of government. Soon after, Megawati Sukarnoputri assumed the presidency on 23 July. Susilo Bambang Yudhoyono won Indonesia's first direct presidential election in 2004, and was reelected in 2009.

Joko Widodo, the PDI-P candidate, was elected president in 2014. Having previously served as the Governor of Jakarta, he is the first Indonesian president without a high-ranking political or military background. However, his opponent Prabowo Subianto disputed the outcome and withdrew from the race before the count was completed. Jokowi was reelected in 2019, again defeating Prabowo Subianto.

However, Prabowo Subianto won the 2024 election with his vice presidential running mate Gibran Rakabuming. On 20 October 2024, Prabowo Subianto was sworn in as Indonesia's eighth president. In January 2025, Indonesia formally joined the BRICS group as the first Southeast Asian nation.

=== Terrorism ===
As a multi-ethnic and multicultural democratic country with a Muslim-majority population, Indonesia faces the challenge of dealing with terrorism linked to global militant Islamic movements. Jemaah Islamiyah (JI), a militant Islamic organisation that aspires for the establishment of a Daulah Islamiyah across Southeast Asia, is responsible for a series of terrorist attacks in Indonesia. This terrorist organisation, linked to Al-Qaeda, was responsible for the Bali bombings in 2002 and 2005, as well as Jakarta bombings in 2003, 2004, and 2009. The Indonesian government and authorities have tried to crack down on terrorist cells in Indonesia.

On 14 January 2016, suicide bombers and gunmen initiated a terror attack in Jakarta, resulting in the death of eight people: three Indonesian civilians, a Canadian and four of the attackers. Twenty people were wounded during the attack. The Islamic State claimed responsibility for the incident.

=== Tsunami disaster and Aceh peace deal ===
On 26 December 2004, a massive earthquake and tsunami devastated parts of northern Sumatra, particularly Aceh. Partly as a result of the need for co-operation and peace during the recovery from the tsunami in Aceh, peace talks between the Indonesian government and the Free Aceh Movement (GAM) were restarted. Accords signed in Helsinki created a framework for military de-escalation in which the government has reduced its military presence, as members of GAM's armed wing decommission their weapons and apply for amnesty. The agreement also allows for local parties to be established, and other autonomy measures.

=== Forest and plantation fires ===
Since 1997 Indonesia has been struggling to contain forest fires, especially on the islands of Sumatra and Kalimantan. Haze occurs annually during the dry season and is largely caused by illegal agricultural fires due to slash-and-burn practices in Indonesia, especially in the provinces of South Sumatra and Riau on Indonesia's Sumatra island, and Kalimantan on Indonesian Borneo. The haze that occurred in 1997 was one of the most severe; dense hazes occurred again in 2005, 2006, 2009, 2013, and the worst was in 2015, killing dozens of Indonesians as a result of respiratory illnesses and road accidents due to poor visibility. Another 10 people were killed due to smog from forest and land fires.

In September 2014, Indonesia ratified the ASEAN Agreement on Transboundary Haze Pollution, becoming the last ASEAN country to do so.

=== COVID-19 pandemic and political unrest ===
Indonesia confirmed its first cases of COVID-19 in March 2020. The government implemented large-scale social restrictions (Pembatasan Sosial Berskala Besar, PSBB) instead of nationwide lockdowns in order to balance public health with economic stability. The country entered its first recession in over two decades as the rupiah depreciated sharply.

In October, protests broke out against the controversial Omnibus Law on Job Creation, leading to over 5,000 arrests. The year was also notable for several high-level corruption scandals, with Social Affairs Minister Juliari Batubara and Maritime Affairs Minister Edhy Prabowo arrested on separate charges.

=== Pandemic response and reform ===
Indonesia conducted its first Intra-Action Review (IAR) in August 2020, leading to new strategies for pandemic preparedness.

On 9 January 2021, Sriwijaya Air Flight 182 crashes into the Java Sea due to an Aircraft upset.

In June 2021, the World Bank approved US$500 million to support vaccinations, testing, and health infrastructure for Indonesia.

By 2022, Indonesia assumed the G20 presidency and launched the Pandemic Fund initiative to bolster global health preparedness.

Domestically, 2022 saw the passage of the Sexual Violence Law, a landmark in gender justice, and confirmation of Nusantara as the site of the new national capital through the State Capital Law. The government also created five new provinces in Papua, reshuffled the cabinet, and gradually lifted most COVID-19 restrictions, ending the PPKM system in December.

== Nusantara project and transition of power ==
Construction of Nusantara, envisioned as a sustainable “forest city” in East Kalimantan, began in 2022. The government targeted August 2024 for partial inauguration, including the new presidential palace. However, by mid-2024, the inauguration was indefinitely postponed due to delays in infrastructure and lack of private investment.

In October 2024, Prabowo Subianto was inaugurated as President of Indonesia, succeeding Joko Widodo. His cabinet of 48 ministers and 55 deputies became the largest since the mid-1960s. Prabowo emphasized economic self-sufficiency, industrialization, and anti-corruption reforms while continuing (but scaling down) the Nusantara relocation project.

Indonesia also achieved sporting success at the 2024 Paris Summer Olympics, winning two gold medals (in sport climbing and weightlifting) and one bronze, its first Olympic golds outside of badminton.

In late August to early September 2025, Indonesia hosted Super Garuda Shield, a large multinational military exercise involving around 6,500 troops from 13 countries.

The same year, the country witnessed widespread protests sparked by revelations of high housing allowances (~50 million IDR per month) granted to lawmakers. The unrest intensified after the death of a 21-year-old delivery driver, Affan Kurniawan, during demonstrations. Several cities saw buildings set ablaze, with at least seven deaths, hundreds of injuries, and over 1,200 arrests. The military was deployed, and the government pledged to reduce perks and investigate the incidents. The United Nations called for an independent inquiry.

In September 2025, former Education Minister and Gojek founder Nadiem Makarim was detained as a suspect in a corruption case linked to the procurement of Chromebooks in 2021.

== See also ==
- Foreign relations of Indonesia
- History of Southeast Asia
- List of presidents of Indonesia
- Politics of Indonesia

Museums

- Jakarta History Museum
- National Museum of Indonesia

== Bibliography ==
- Brown, Colin (2003). A Short History of Indonesia. Crows Nest, New South Wales: Allen & Unwin.
- Cribb, Robert. Historical atlas of Indonesia (Routledge, 2013).
- Crouch, Harold. The army and politics in Indonesia (Cornell UP, 2019).
- Drakeley, Steven. The History Of Indonesia (2005) online
- Earl, George Windsor (1850). "On the Leading Characteristics of the Papuan, Australian and Malay-Polynesian Nations". Journal of the Indian Archipelago and Eastern Asia. 4.
- Elson, Robert Edward. The idea of Indonesia: A history. Vol. 1 (Cambridge UP, 2008).
- Friend, T. (2003). Indonesian Destinies. Harvard University Press. ISBN 978-0-674-01137-3.
- Gouda, Frances. American Visions of the Netherlands East Indies/Indonesia: US Foreign Policy and Indonesian Nationalism, 1920-1949 (Amsterdam University Press, 2002) online Archived 21 January 2020 at the Wayback Machine; another copy online Archived 19 July 2018 at the Wayback Machine
- Hindley, Donald. The Communist Party of Indonesia, 1951–1963 (U of California Press, 1966).
- Kahin, George McTurnan (1952). Nationalism and Revolution in Indonesia. Ithaca, NY: Cornell University Press.
- Melvin, Jess (2018). The Army and the Indonesian Genocide: Mechanics of Mass Murder. Routledge. ISBN 978-1138574694.
- Reid, Anthony (1974). The Indonesian National Revolution 1945–1950. Melbourne: Longman Pty Ltd. ISBN 978-0-582-71046-7.
- Ricklefs, M.C. (1993). War, Culture and Economy in Java, 1677–1726: Asian and European Imperialism in the Early Kartasura Period. Sydney: Asian Studies Association of Australia. ISBN 978-1-86373-380-9.
- Robinson, Geoffrey B. (2018). The Killing Season: A History of the Indonesian Massacres, 1965-66. Princeton University Press. ISBN 9781400888863.
- Taylor, Jean Gelman (2003). Indonesia. New Haven and London: Yale University Press. ISBN 978-0-300-10518-6.
- Vickers, Adrian (2005). A History of Modern Indonesia. Cambridge University Press. ISBN 978-0-521-54262-3.
- Whitten, T.; Soeriaatmadja, R. E.; Suraya, A. A. (1996). The Ecology of Java and Bali. Hong Kong: Periplus Editions Ltd.
- Witton, Patrick (2003). Indonesia. Melbourne: Lonely Planet. pp. 26–28. ISBN 1-74059-154-2.
- Woodward, Mark R. Islam in Java: Normative Piety and Mysticism in the Sultanate of Yogyakarta (1989)
