= Sunda Kingdom =

Hindu kingdom on the island of Java from 932 AD to 1579

Sunda Kingdom ᮕᮢᮠᮏᮡ ᮔ᮪ ᮕᮞᮥᮔ᮪ᮓᮔ᮪ Prahajyan Sunda (Old Sundanese)
- 932 AD–1579
- The territory of Sunda Kingdom
- Capital: Pakuan Pajajaran; Kawali
- Common languages: Old Sundanese; Sanskrit
- Religion: Sunda Wiwitan; Hinduism; Buddhism
- Government: Absolute monarchy
- Maharaja
  - 1030–1042: Sri Jayabhupati (first)
  - 1371–1475: Niskala Wastu Kancana
  - 1475–1482: Susuk Tunggal
  - 1482–1521: Sri Baduga Maharaja
  - 1521–1535: Surawisesa
  - 1567–1579: Raja Mulya (last)
- History
  - Kingdom established: 932 AD
  - Sunda–Portuguese Treaty: 1522
  - Conquest of Sunda Kelapa by Demak: 1527
  - Disestablished: 1579
- Currency: Native gold and silver coins
Preceded by
Taruma Kingdom
Galuh Kingdom
Succeeded by
Banten Sultanate
Cirebon Sultanate
Sumedang Larang Kingdom
- Today part of: Indonesia

The Sunda Kingdom (Old Sundanese: ᮕᮢ(pra)ᮠ(ha)ᮏᮡ (jya)ᮔ᮪(n) ᮞᮥ(su)ᮔ᮪(n)ᮓ(da), romanized: Prahajyan Sunda, Indonesian pronunciation: [ˈsunda]) was a Sundanese Hindu kingdom located in the western portion of the island of Java from 932 AD to around 1579, covering the area of present-day Banten, Jakarta, West Java, Lampung, and the western part of Central Java. The capital of the Sunda Kingdom moved several times during its history, shifting between the Galuh (Kawali) area in the east and Pakuan Pajajaran in the west.

The Sunda Kingdom reached its peak during the reign of King Sri Baduga Maharaja, whose reign from 1482 to 1521 is traditionally remembered as an age of peace and prosperity among Sundanese people.

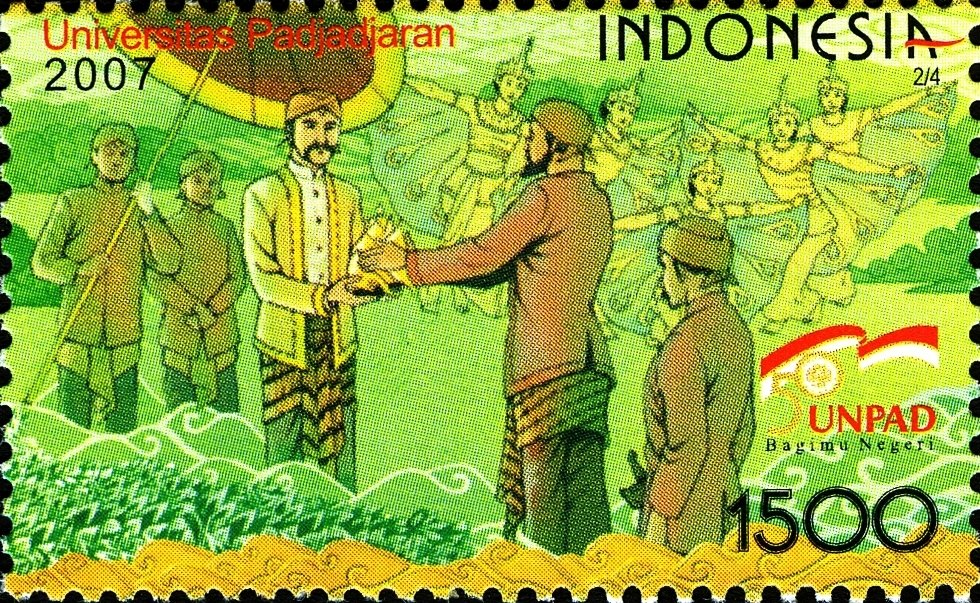
An image of an Indonesian stamp depicting the nobility of the Sundanese kingdom of Pajajaran presenting the Royal Crown.

According to primary historical records such as the Bujangga Manik manuscript, the eastern border of the kingdom was the Pemali River (Ci Pamali; the present-day Brebes River) and the Serayu River (Ci Sarayu) in Central Java. Most accounts of the Sunda Kingdom come from primary historical records from the 16th century AD. The kingdom's inhabitants were primarily the eponymous ethnic Sundanese, while the majority religion was Hinduism.

== Etymology ==
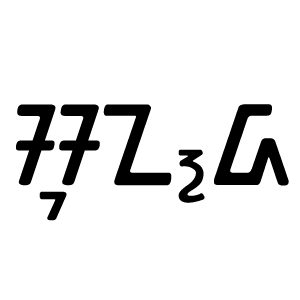
The word Sunda written in Sundanese script.

The name Sunda derives from the Sanskrit prefix su- which means "goodness" or "possessing good quality". The example is suvarna (lit: "good color") used to describe gold. Sunda is also another name for Hindu God Vishnu. In Sanskrit, the term Sundara (masculine) or Sundari (feminine) means "beautiful" or "excellence". According to Reinout Willem van Bemmelen, a Dutch geologist, the name Sunda was derived from Sanskrit term Shuddha, which means 'white' and 'pure'. The term Sunda also means 'bright, light, purity, cleanness, and white'.

The name Sunda is also known in Hindu mythology of Sunda and Upasunda, as one of the powerful Asura brothers that received the boon of invulnerability from Brahma. It is not clear, however, whether the eponymous Sunda was derived from this Hindu myth.

It seems that by the 10th century, the name Sunda was used by foreigners, possibly by early Indian explorers, Malay Srivijayan traders and colonizer, as well as Javanese neighbours, as a toponym to identify the Western parts of Java. The Juru Pangambat inscription, dated from 854 Saka (932 AD), confirmes this. The name is similarly used by the Javanese to identify their western neighbour, also rival and enemy, as mentioned in Horren inscription (c. 11th century) from Kediri.

An early 13th-century AD Chinese account reported the pepper port of Sin-t'o (Sunda), which probably referred to the port of Banten or Sunda Kalapa. By the 15th to 16th century AD, after the consolidation of the kingdom by Sri Baduga Maharaja, the name Sunda had shifted from a toponym, into a name that identified a kingdom and its people. The Sunda Strait is named after the Sunda Kingdom, the latter having once ruled the area on both coasts of the strait.

== Historiography ==
Knowledge of the kingdom among Sundanese people has been kept alive through Sundanese Pantun oral tradition, the chant of poetic verses about the golden age of Sunda Pajajaran, and the legend of Prabu Siliwangi, the most popular king of Sunda.

Several stone inscriptions mention the kingdom, such as Juru Pangambat, Jayabupati, Kawali, and Batutulis. Most account and records of the Sunda Kingdom are derived from manuscripts dated from a later period circa 15th to 16th century, such as Bujangga Manik, Sanghyang Siksakanda ng Karesian, Carita Parahyangan, and Kidung Sunda.

=== Local account ===
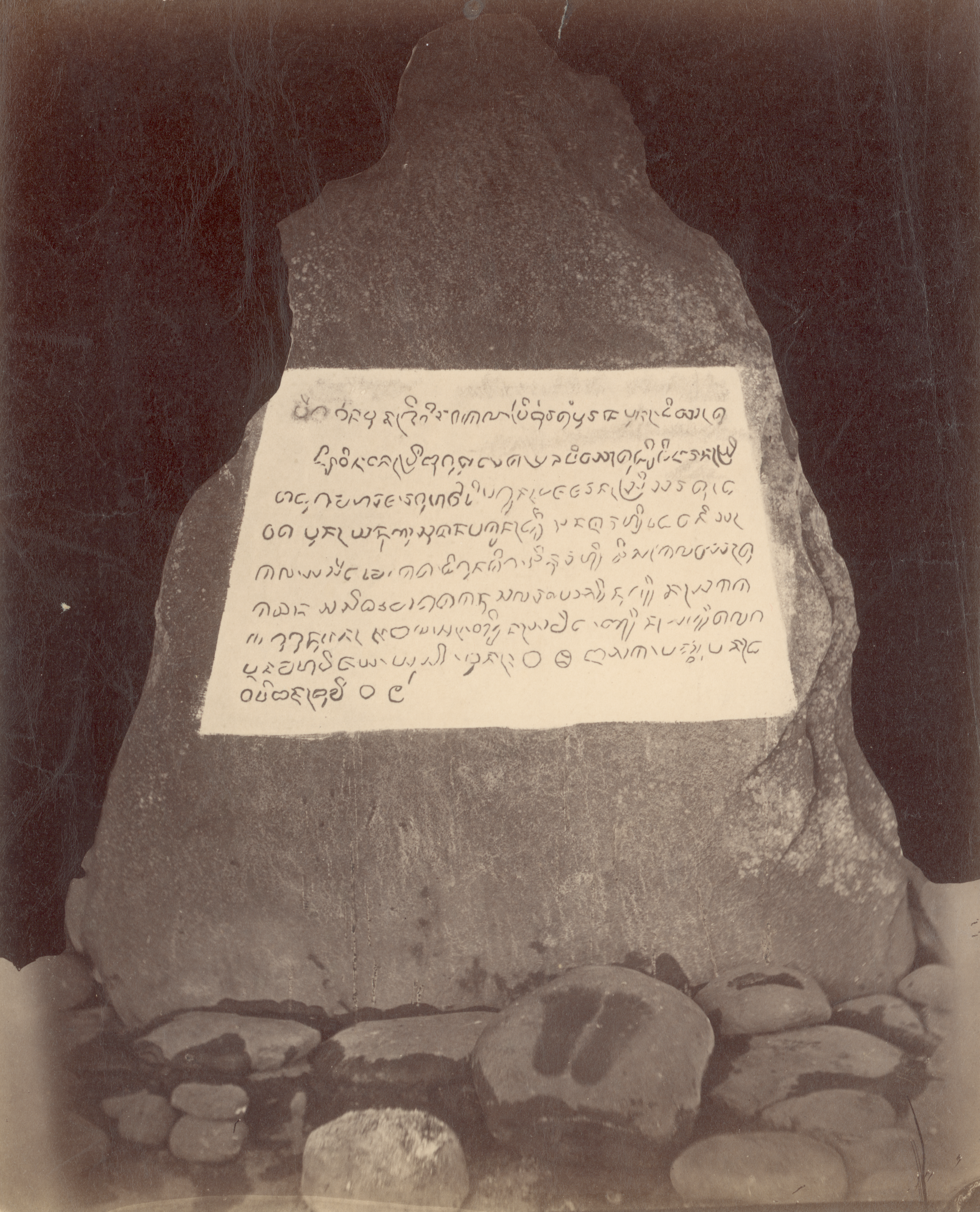
Batutulis inscription (dated 1533), in Bogor, commemorate the great King of Sunda Sri Baduga Maharaja (rule 1482–1521).

The earliest reference to the name "Sunda" being used to identify a kingdom is the Kebon Kopi II inscription dated 854 Saka (932 AD). This inscription is in the Kawi script, but the language used is Old Malay. It translates as follows:

This memorial stone is to remark the saying of Rakryan Juru Pangambat (Royal Hunter), in 854 Saka, that the order of government is returned to the power of the king of Sunda.

Another reference to the kingdom is the Jayabupati inscription which consists of 40 lines written on four pieces of stone, found on the Cicatih river bank in Cibadak, Sukabumi. This inscription is again written in Kawi script, and mentions the establishment of a protected sacred area called Sanghyang Tapak by the King Jayabhupati of Sunda. The inscription is dated to 1030 AD.

Copperplate letters dating to the 15th century AD, including royal instructions, also support the existence of the Sunda Kingdom. The copperplate inscription of Kebantenan I (Jayagiri) reads that Raja Rahyang Niskala Wastu Kancana sent an order through Hyang Ningrat Kancana to the Susuhunan of Pakuan Pajajaran to take care of dayohan in Jayagiri and Sunda Sembawa, banning the collection of collecting taxes from the residents, because they would be knowledgeable about the Hindu religion and worshipped the gods.

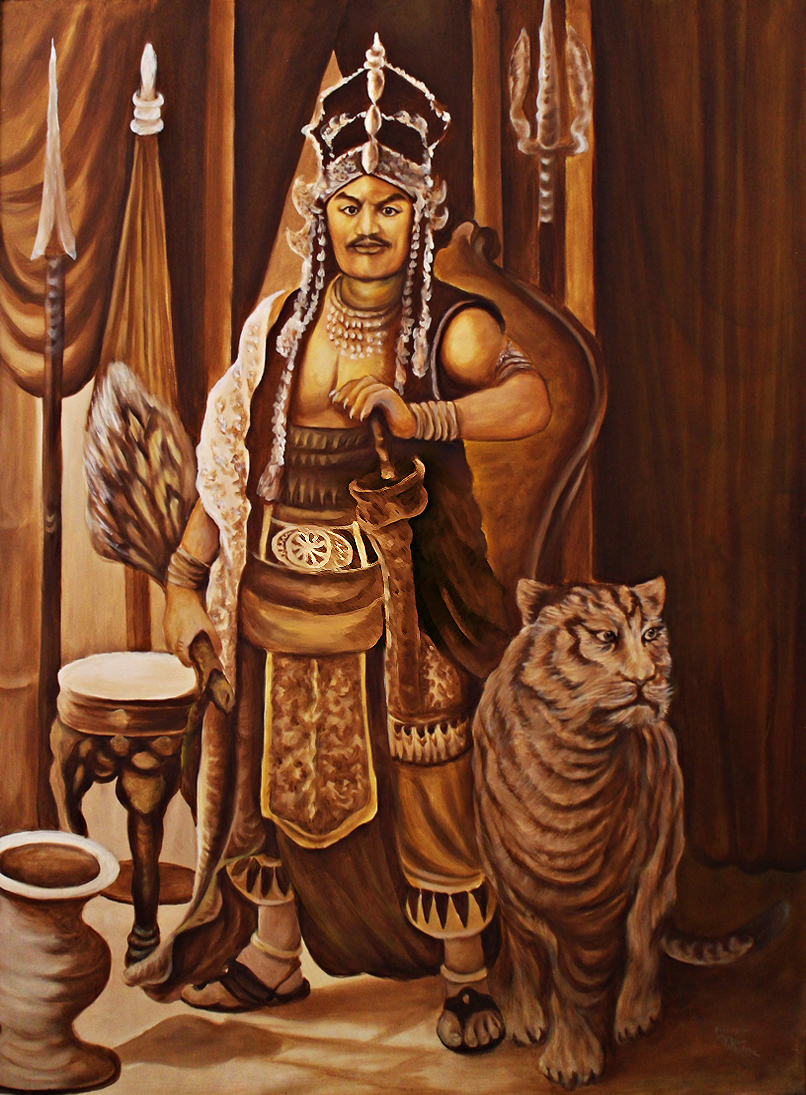
Portrait of King Siliwangi (Sri Baduga Maharaja), the legendary king of the Sunda Kingdom.

The Kebantenan II (or Sunda Sembawa I) copperplate inscription announces Sri Baduga Maharaja (1482–1521), the king in Pakuan, approved an already delineated sacred estate (tanah devasasana) put at the disposal of the wiku (priests), which must not be split as it houses facilities for worship, which belong to the king. The Kebantenan III (Sunda Sembawa II) copperplate inscription announces the king of Sunda's sanctions of holy construction in Sunda Sembawa. The Kebantenan IV inscription details that Sri Baduga Maharaja, who ruled in Pakuan, sanctioned a similar sacred estate at Gunung Samya (Mount Rancamaya).

The Batutulis inscription is still in situ at its original location. This inscription commemorates the great king of the Sundanese kingdom named Prabu Guru Dewata Prana who was later crowned as Sri Baduga Maharaja Ratu Haji at Pakuan Pajajaran Sri Sang Ratu Dewata. The king's genealogy states that he was the son of Rahyang Dewa Niskala who died in Gunung Tiga, and the grandson of Rahyang Niskala Wastu Kancana who died in Nusa Larang. It was stated that Sri Baduga had made several works, including making defensive ditches to protect the city of Pakuan, making memorials, making gugunungan (mountains, perhaps punden terraces), making paving halls with rocks, samida forests or making ceremonial places, as well as create telaga warna.

The Bujangga Manik] manuscript is the primary source on the daily life of the Sunda Kingdom in the late 15th to early 16th century. Detailing place names, culture and customs, in great detail, it is considered one of the important specimens of Old Sundanese literature. The manuscript tells the story of Jaya Pakuan alias Bujangga Manik, though a prince at the court of Pakuan Pajajaran, preferred to live a solitary life as a devout Hindu. As a hermit traveller, the book details two journeys from Pakuan Pajajaran to central and eastern Java and back, the second journey including a visit to Bali. It is concluded that Jaya Pakuan practised asceticism on a mountain in western Java until his death. As manuscript dates from the pre-Islamic Sunda era, it is written in an older form of Sundanese. It does not contain any words traceable to Arabic. Islamic influence is absent from the content of the story as well. The specific mention of Majapahit, Malacca, and Demak, allow us to date the writing of the story in the 15th century AD, probably the latter part of this century, or the early 16th century at the latest.

=== Chinese account ===
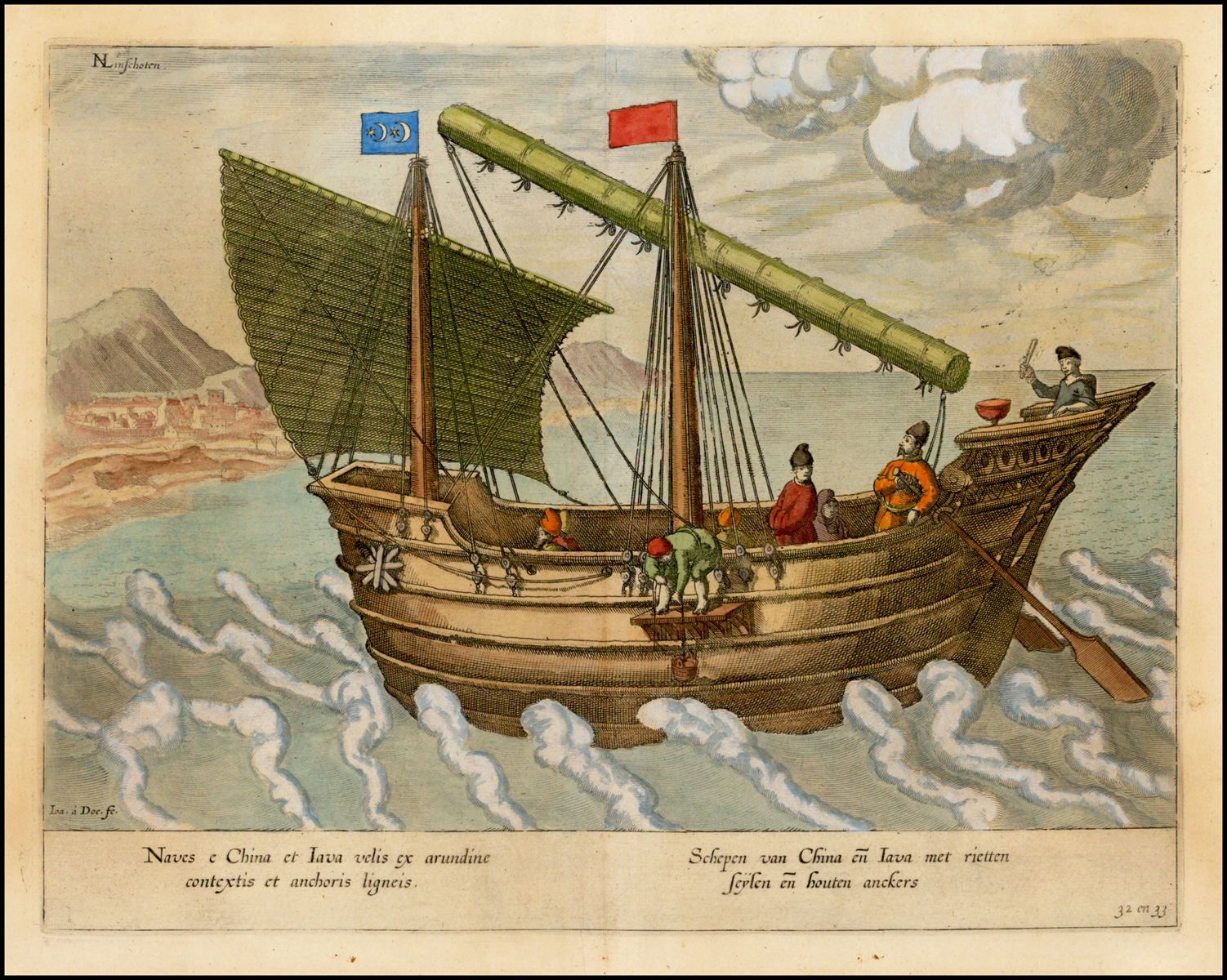
The Sundanese royal party sailed to Majapahit by Jong sasanga wangunan ring Tatarnagari tiniru, a type of junk, which also incorporates Chinese techniques, such as using iron nails alongside wooden dowels, the construction of watertight bulkhead, and addition of central rudder.

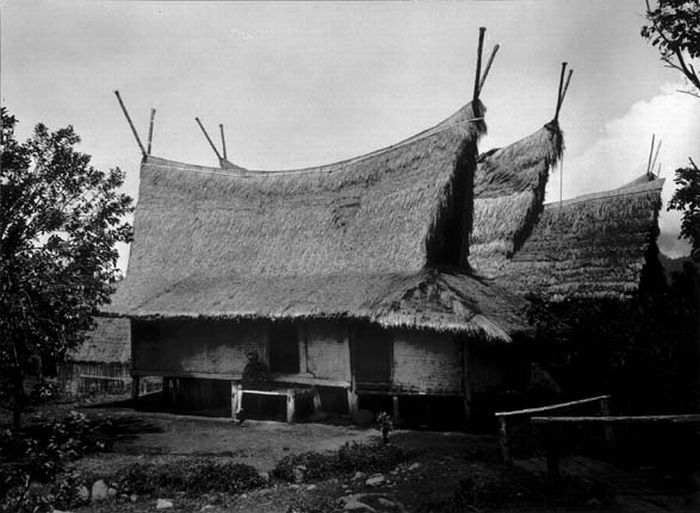
Sundanese traditional house with Julang Ngapak roof in Garut circa 1920s. It was built on poles and having a thatched roof, as described in a 12th-century Chinese source.

According to F. Hirt and W.W. Rockhill, there are Chinese sources concerning the Sunda Kingdom. At the time of the Southern Sung dynasty, the inspector of trade with foreign countries, Chau Ju-kua, collected reports from sailors and merchants who had visited foreign countries. His report on far countries, Chu-fan-chi, written from 1178 to 1225, mentions the deepwater harbour of Sin-t’o (Sunda). Chu-fan-chi reported that:

All along the shores, people are dwelling. The people are working in agriculture, their houses are on poles and the roofs are thatched with the bark of the leaves of palm trees and the walls were made with wooden boards tied together with rattan. Both men and women wrap around their loins a piece of cotton, and in cutting their hair they only leave it half an inch long. The pepper grown on the hills (of this country) is small-grained but heavy and superior to that of Ta-pan (Tuban in eastern Java). The country produces pumpkins, sugar cane, bottle gourd, beans and egg plants. As, however, there is no regular government in this country, the people are given to brigandage, on which account foreign traders rarely go there.

According to this source, the kingdom of Sunda produced high-quality black pepper. The kingdom located in the western parts of Java near Sunda Strait, corresponds to today Banten, Jakarta, and the west part of West Java province. According to this source, the port of Sunda was under Srivijaya mandala domination. This Port of Sunda was highly possible to refer to Old Banten instead of Kalapa (present-day North Jakarta). Its capital is located 10 kilometres inland southward in Banten Girang near Mount Pulosari.

The Chinese book “Shun-Feng Hsiang-Sung" from around 1430 relates:

In this voyage eastward from Sunda, along the north coast of Java, ships steered 97 1/2 degrees for three watches to make Kalapa; they then followed the coast (past Tanjung Indramayu), finally steering 187 1/2 degrees for four watches to reach Cirebon. Ships from Banten proceeded eastward along the north coast of Java, past Kalapa, past Indramayu head, past Cirebon.

According to this source, the port of Sunda was located west of Kalapa and later identified as the port of Old Banten.

=== European account ===
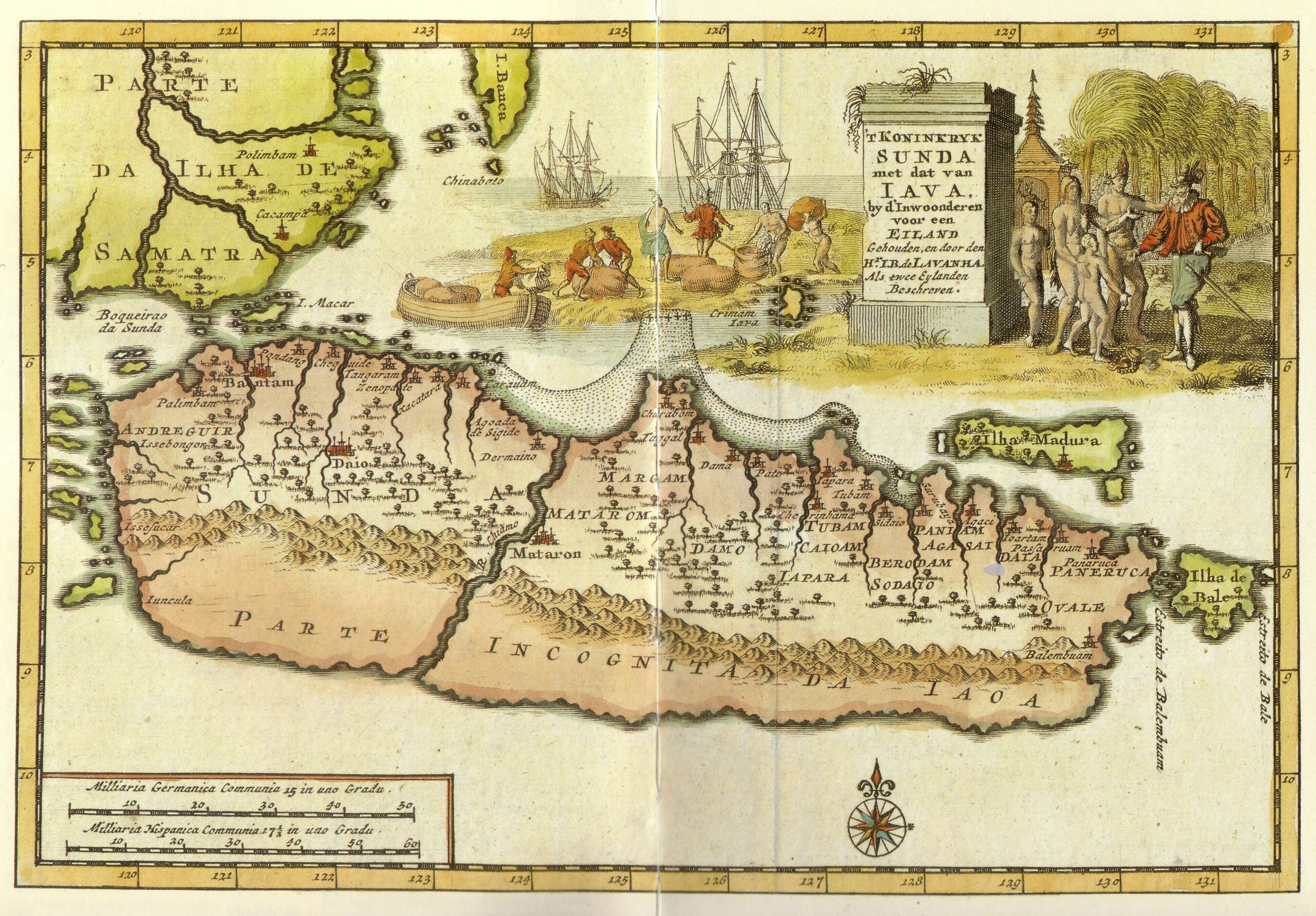
Old map of Java still thought that land of Sunda in the west is separated from the rest of Java island. Here the capital of Sunda is called Daio which refer to Dayeuh Pakuan Pajajaran.

European explorers, mainly Portuguese based in Malacca, also reported the existence of the Sunda Kingdom. Tomé Pires (1513) mentioned a Western Java kingdom that had established trade relation with them as Regño de Çumda, which means "Kingdom of Sunda". Also the report of Antonio Pigafetta (1522) that mentioned Sunda as a pepper producing region.

Tomé Pires from Portugal wrote in his report Suma Oriental (1513–1515):

Some people affirm that the Sunda kingdom takes up half of the whole island of Java; others, to whom more authority is attributed, say that the Sunda kingdom must be a third part of the island and an eight more. It ends at the river Cimanuk. The river intersects the whole island from sea to sea in such a way that when the people of Java describe their own country, they say that it is bounded to the west by the island of Sunda. The people hold that whoever passes this strait (the river Cimanuk) into the South Sea is carried off by violent currents and unable to return.

The Portuguese report is dated from a later period of the kingdom, shortly before its fall to forces of the Sultanate of Banten.

== History ==
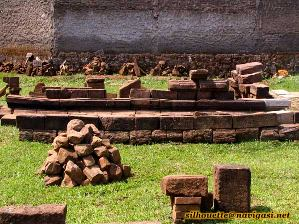
The ruin of Bojongmenje Hindu temple in Priangan highlands, estimated was built in the 7th century.

The history of the Sunda Kingdom spanned for almost a millennium, between the 7th to 16th century AD. One of the few remnants is the 7th century Bojongmenje Hindu temple near Bandung. It was one of the earliest temple structures in Java, older than temples of Dieng in Central Java, and linked to the Sunda Kingdom.

The earlier period is unclear, much owed to only two manuscripts dated from a much later period, the Carita Parahyangan. Its relations to Tarumanagara, a previous kingdom in western Java is unknown. The history of later period, however, after the late 14th century, is clearer especially following the reign of King Wastu Kancana and Sri Baduga Maharaja. This is contributed mainly to the availability of historical sources, including numbers of foreign reports, especially Portuguese's Suma Oriental, several stone inscriptions (prasasti) especially Batutulis, and native primary historical manuscripts of Bujangga Manik and Sanghyang Siksakanda ng Karesian.

=== Rakryan Juru Pangambat ===
According to Kebon Kopi II inscription, dated from 932 AD, discovered near Bogor, a skilled hunter named Rakryan Juru Pangambat, declared that the authority is restored to the king of Sunda. This inscription was written in Kawi alphabet, however curiously the language being used is Old Malay. Archaeologist F.D.K. Bosch proposed that this suggests Srivijayan influence over western Java. French historian, Claude Guillot proposed that this was a declaration of independence of the Sunda Kingdom, possibly from Srivijaya.

=== Jayabupati ===
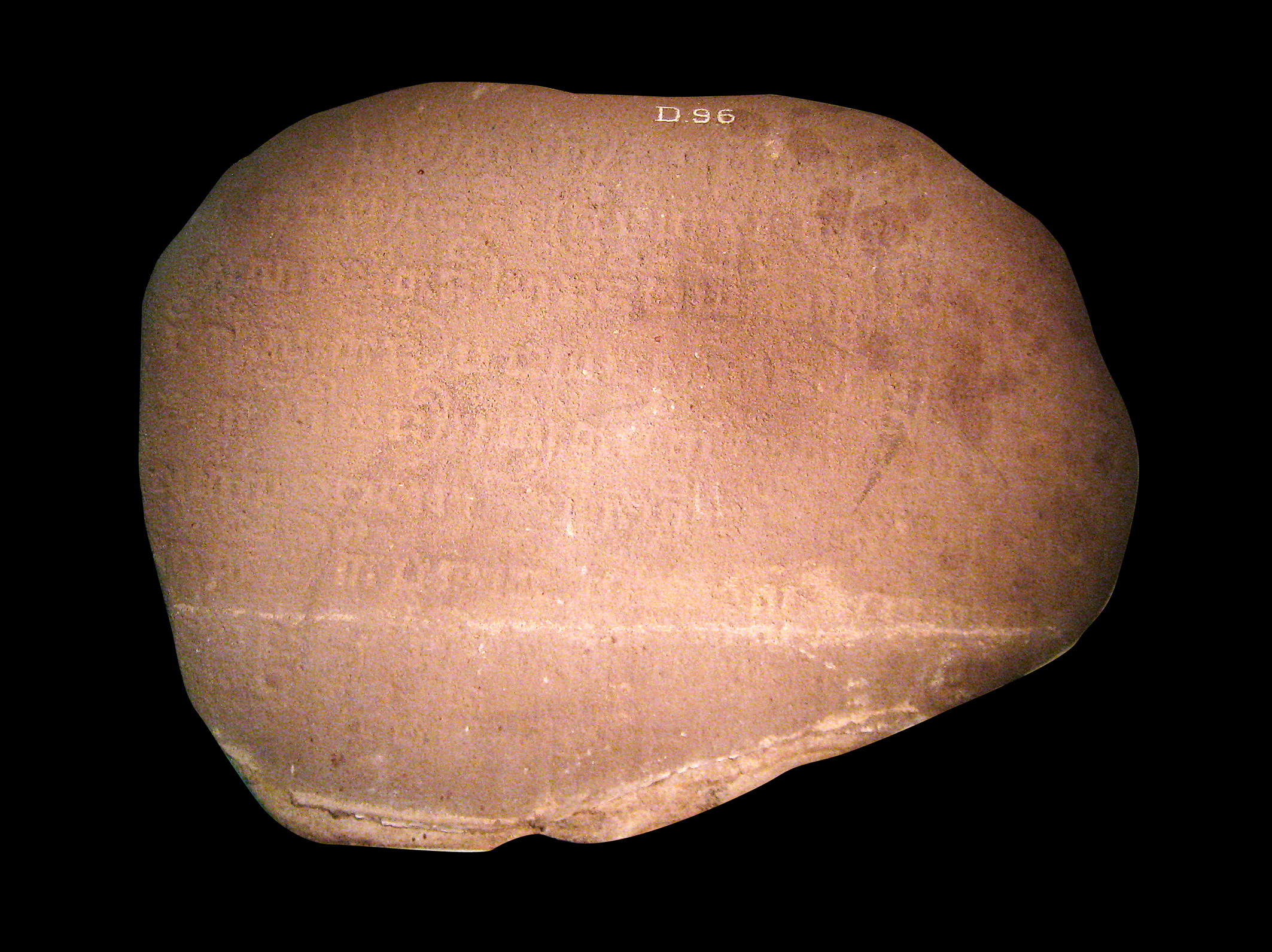
Sanghyang Tapak inscription in Sukabumi.

According to Sanghyang Tapak inscription, dated from 1030 found in Cibadak near Sukabumi, a king, Maharaja Sri Jayabupati, has established a sacred sanctuary of Sanghyang Tapak. Curiously, the style of the inscriptions reveal an East Javanese script, language, and style, akin to Dharmawangsa's court of Mataram. This has led to suggestions that the Sunda Kingdom at this time probably was under the influence of Mataram, or probably Jayabupati subscribed to Javanese culture.

Sri Jayabupati in Carita Parahyangan is mentioned as Prabu Detya Maharaja. The 11th century AD Horren inscription found in southern Kediri, reported that çatru Sunda ("enemy from Sunda") had invaded and menacing villages in East Java.

After Sri Jayabupati, there is no stone inscription discovered mentioning the next ruler. There is no tangible evidence discovered from the period between the 11th to the 14th century AD. Most of our current knowledge about this period came from Carita Parahyangan.

The Song Chinese source, Chu-fan-chi circa 1200, mentioned that Srivijaya still ruled Sumatra, the Malay peninsula, and Sin-to (Sunda). The source describes the port of Sunda as strategic and thriving, pepper from Sunda being among the best in quality. The people worked in agriculture and their houses were built on wooden poles (rumah panggung). However, robbers and thieves plagued the country. The port of Sunda referred by Chou Ju-kua probably referred to Old Banten, instead of Sunda Kelapa. It seems that by the early 13th century, the maritime trade was still dominated by Srivijayan mandala based in Sumatra.

=== Golden age ===
The name Sunda appeared in Javanese source, the Pararaton, reported that in 1336, during the inauguration of his newly appointed position as Prime Minister, Gajah Mada declared the Palapa oath, which stated his foreign policy to unify the archipelago under Majapahit domination. Pararaton recorded what Gajah Mada had said:

"Sira Gajah Madapatih Amangkubhumi tan ayun amuktia palapa, sira Gajah Mada: Lamun huwus kalah Nusantara isun amukti palapa, lamun kalah ring Gurun, ring Seran, Tañjung Pura, ring Haru, ring Pahang, Dompo, ring Bali, Sunda, Palembang, Tumasik, samana isun amukti palapa."

Translation:

"He, Gajah Mada the Patih Amangkubumi, does not wish to cease his fasting. Gajah Mada: "If (I succeed) in defeating (conquering) Nusantara, (then) I will break my fast. If Gurun, Seram, Tanjung Pura, Haru, Pahang, Dompo, Bali, Sunda, Palembang, Temasek, are all defeated, (then) I will break my fast."

Sunda was mentioned as one of the kingdoms targeted by Mada's overseas campaign. It seems by the early 14th century, the Kingdom of Sunda has grown quite prosperous and took part in international maritime trade.

==== Prabu Maharaja ====
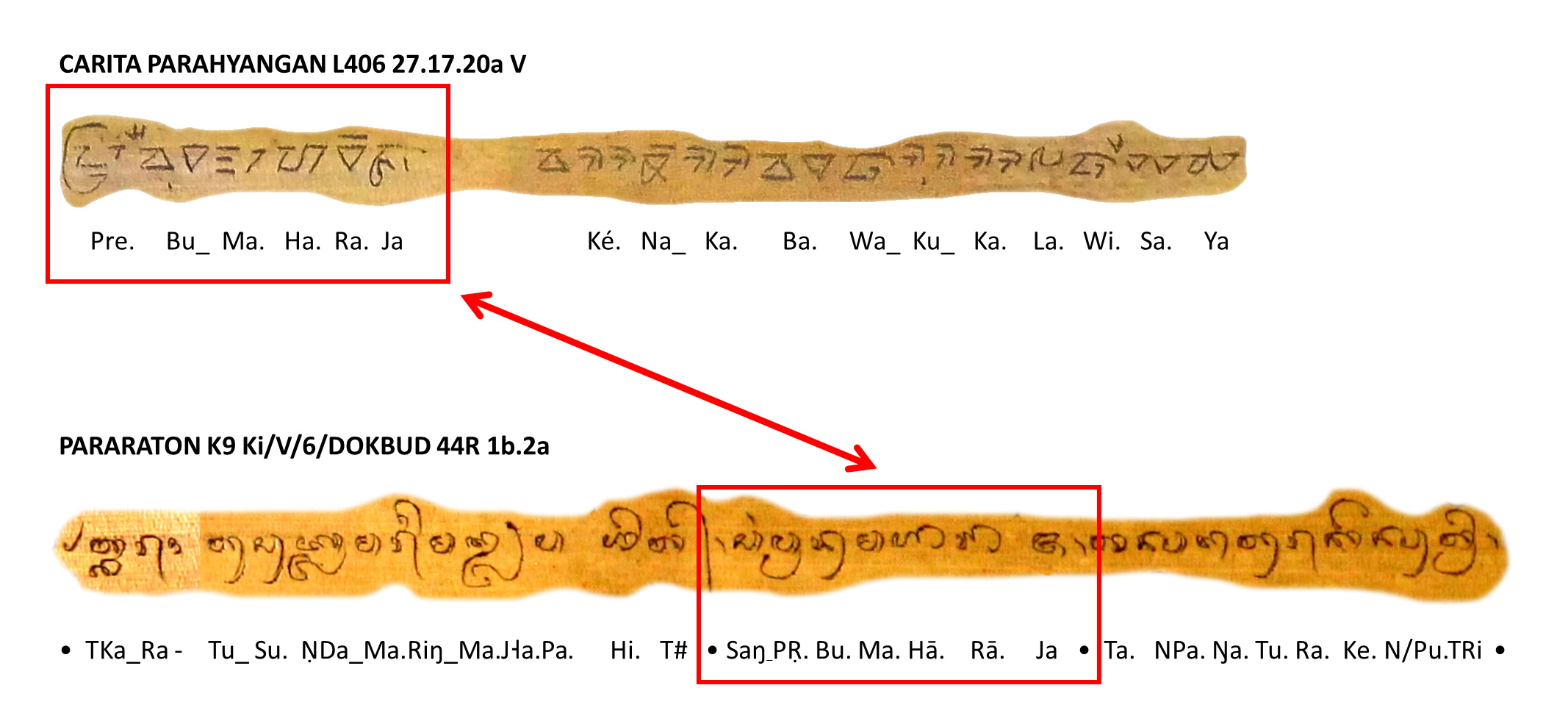
"Prabu Maharaja" written in both lontar Carita Parahiyangan (15 C AD) & Pararaton (19 C AD).

The Carita Parahyangan and Pararaton named him as Prěbu Maharaja, while the pseudohistorical Wangsakerta give a detailed name of Prabu Maharaja Lingga Buana. He ruled from Kawali Galuh, and died in the Battle of Bubat in 1357, fell victim to a stratagem crafted by the Majapahit prime minister, Gajah Mada.

Hayam Wuruk, the king of Majapahit, intended to marry Princess Dyah Pitaloka, the daughter of Prabu Maharaja. Delighted, the Sunda king and his royal family came to Majapahit, to marry off his daughter to Hayam Wuruk. The Sunda party erected the encampment on Bubat square in the northern part of Trowulan and awaited the proper wedding ceremony. Gajah Mada however, saw this event as an opportunity to demand Sunda's submission to Majapahit overlordship and insisted that the princess was to be presented as a token of submission.

Angered and humiliated, the Sunda king decided to cancel the wedding and to return home, resulting in a skirmish between the Sunda royal family and the Majapahit army. Outnumbered, almost the entire Sundanese party, including the princess, perished in this tragedy. The tradition says Princess Dyah Pitaloka committed suicide to defend the honour of her country. After his death, Prabu Maharaja was revered as Prabu Wangi (lit. 'King with pleasant fragrance') for the heroic defence of his honour. Thus his successors, the later kings of Sunda, were later called Siliwangi (lit. successor of Wangi). The story is the main theme of the book Kidung Sunda, another source reporting this incident found in Bali.

==== Niskala Wastu Kancana ====
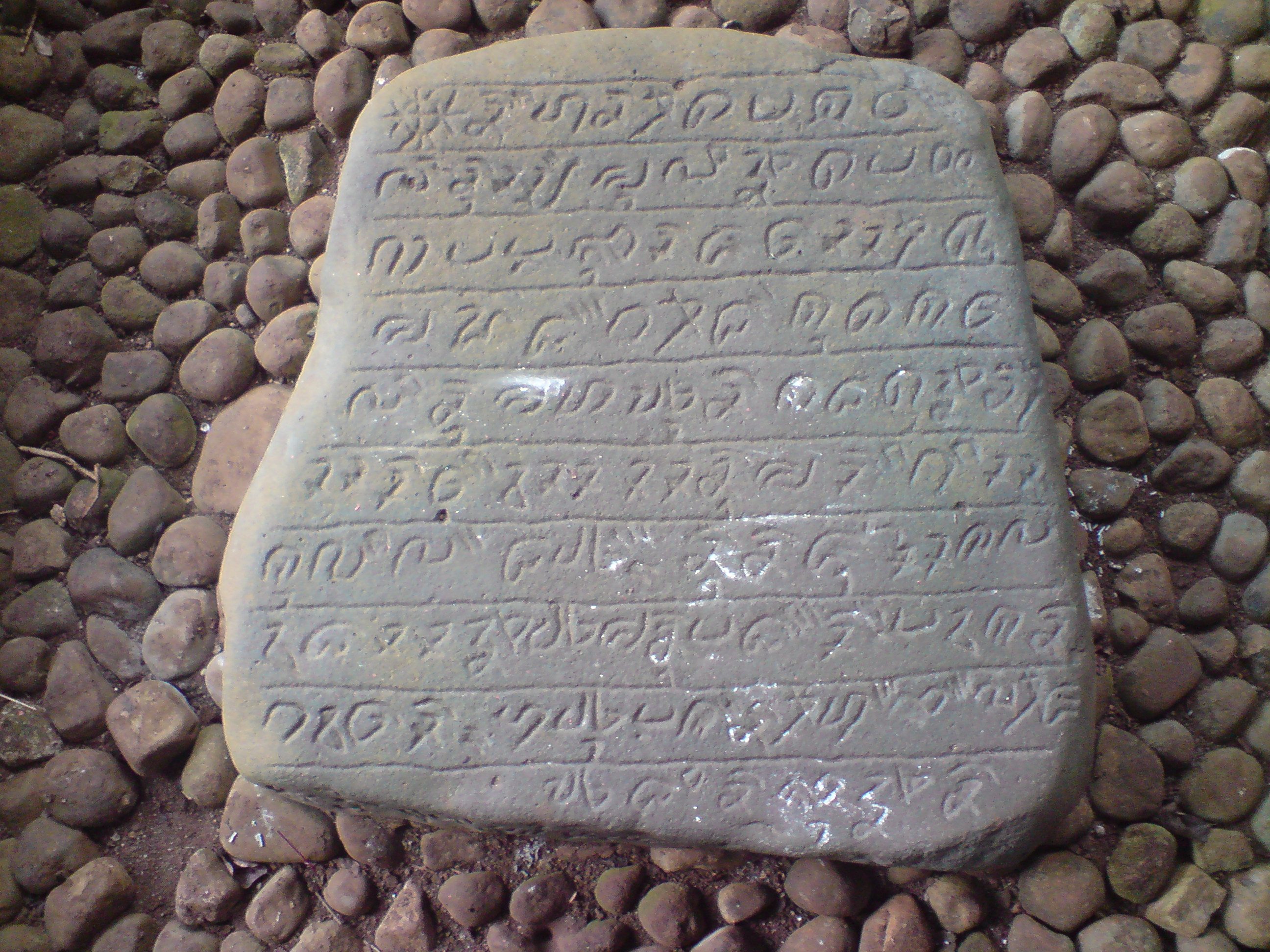
One of Kawali inscriptions.

The next king of Sunda was Niskala Wastu Kancana, who was the youngest son of Prabu Maharaja and younger brother to Princess Dyah Pitaloka, who both perished in Bubat Incident. In 1371, Prince Wastu ascended to the throne, stylized as Prabu Raja Wastu Kancana. According to one of Astana Gede inscriptions, approximately dated from the second half of the 14th century, the king ordered the construction of defensive structures, walls and moats surrounding Kawali city, and renovated Surawisesa palace. The construction of moats and other defensive measures, was probably as a response to a perceived foreign threat. Especially since the relations between Sunda and its powerful eastern neighbour Majapahit empire badly deteriorated following the Bubat incident. Niskala Wastu then resided in Kawali palace of Galuh. His reign is remembered as a long era of peace and prosperity.

The copperplate inscription of Kebantenan I reads that Raja Rahyang Niskala Wastu Kancana sent an order through Hyang Ningrat Kancana to the Susuhunan of Pakuan Pajajaran to take care of dayohan in Jayagiri and Sunda Sembawa, banning the collection of taxes from the residents because they were knowledgeable about the Hindu religion and worshipped the gods.

According to Batutulis inscription, Rahyang Niskala Wastu Kancana was buried in Nusalarang, and supported by Carita Parahyangan manuscript that mentioned "Prebu Niskala Wastu Kancana surup di Nusalarang ring giri Wanakusumah". At this point, the capital was still located in Galuh, more precisely in Kawali city.

==== Ningrat Kancana ====
Niskala Wastu Kancana's son, named as Tohaan di Galuh (Lord of Galuh) in Carita Parahyangan, succeeded him as the king. He was mentioned in Kebantenan I inscription as Hyang Ningrat Kancana and in Batutulis inscription as Rahyang Dewa Niskala.

The new king, however, reigned for only seven years and subsequently demoted. Carita Parahyangan tells that "... kena salah twa(h) bogo(h) ka estri larangan ti kaluaran ..," which translate as "because (his) wrongdoing, fell in love with a forbidden outsider woman." Although it was unclear as to what the line mean, it was possible that the forbidden outsider woman was a Muslim, signifying the presence of Islam in western Java.

According to the Batutulis inscription, Rahyang Dewa Niskala was later buried in Gunatiga. This information is supported by Carita Parahyangan which mentioned that Tohaan di Galuh was nu surup di Gunung Tilu' 'died or buried in Gunung Tilu' (tilu means 'three'), which corresponds to Gunung Tilu mountain range located east of the town of Kuningan.

==== Sri Baduga Maharaja ====
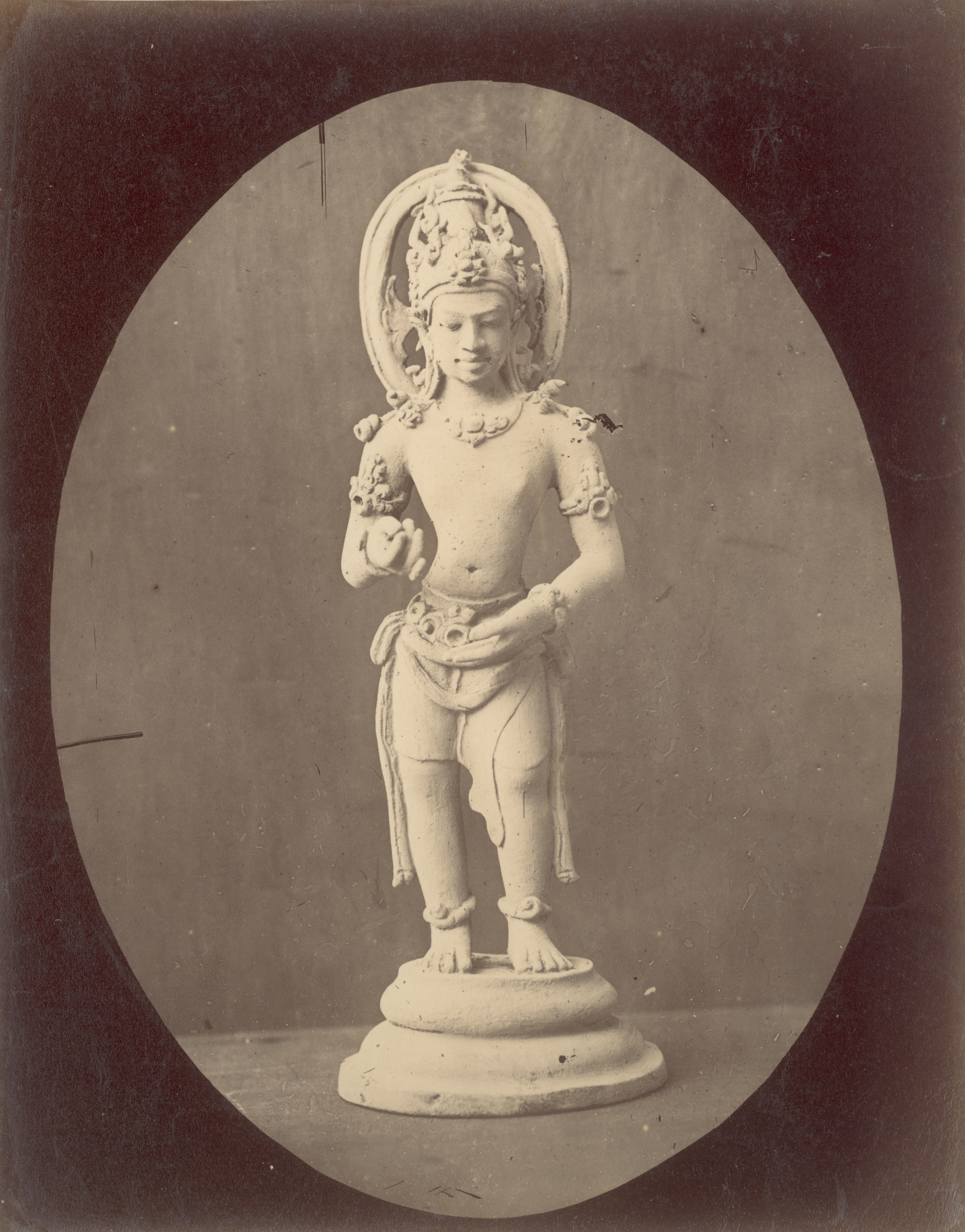
Statue of a Hindu God from Talaga near Kuningan, West Java, dated from the Sunda Kingdom.

Sang Ratu Jayadewata (reigned 1482 to 1521) or also known as Sri Baduga Maharaja, is a grandson of Prabu Wastu Kancana. Jayadewata is often linked with a popular character Prabu Siliwangi in the Sundanese oral tradition of pantun.

King Jayadewata moved the government seat from Kawali back to Pakuan in 1482. It is not clear, however, the reason behind the transfer of capital westward; it might be a geopolitical move to secure the capital away from the eastern threat from the rising Muslim power of Demak in Central Java. By 1482, according to Purwaka Caruban Nagari, a Cirebon chronicle, Cirebon declared its independence from Sunda and no longer sent tribute to the Sunda court. Based on the Kebantenan copperplate inscription, he established a tanah devasasana sacred estate at Mount Samya or Rancamaya. He also announced the construction of a sacred compound in Sunda Sembawa, stipulated as the resident of the priests.

According to Batutulis inscription, Sri Baduga Maharaja built defensive moats surrounding Pakuan Pajajaran; he built gugunungan (sacred mounds), established huts and sacred Samya forest, reserves for wood destined for offerings, and the artificial lake Talaga Rena Mahawijaya (which apparently served as a reservoir). Certainly, there was a good road to Sunda Kalapa (present-day Jakarta), the most important harbour of the Sunda kingdom. At the time of Tome Pirés's visit to Pakuan, Sri Baduga Maharaja reigned over the Sunda kingdom.

The reign of King Jayadewata was hailed as the golden age of the Sundanese people. The kingdom consolidated its rule and exercised power throughout the western part of Java. It also marked the era of great prosperity resulting from efficient agriculture management and the thriving pepper trade in the region. This era of great wealth also marked the beginning of the Sunda kingdom's decline.

=== Decline ===
During the reign of King Jayadewata, there was already a group of Sunda inhabitants that had converted to Islam, as testified by Portuguese account. Tomé Pires in 1513 reported, there was a significant number of Muslims residing in the port of Cimanuk (today Indramayu), the easternmost port of Sunda Kingdom. According to a Portuguese report, the port of Cirebon which is located just east of Cimanuk is already a Muslim port by that time, ruled by Javanese.

These new converts most probably were the people referred to in Carita Parahyangan as "those who felt no peace because of having strayed from Sanghyang Siksa". Nevertheless, during this time, Islamic influence had not yet penetrated inland into the capital. As mentioned in Carita Parahyangan that "mana mo kadatangan ku musuh ganal, musu(h) alit", which means the capital is "safe from rough/coarse enemy, (as well as) soft/subtle enemy". The term "coarse enemy" refers to an actual invading foreign army, while "subtle enemy" refers to the propagation of a new faith or new religion that might upset the established spiritual order of the kingdom.

The kingdom anxiously watched the growing influence of the expansive Islamic Sultanate of Demak that finally succeeded in destroying Daha, the remnant of the Hindu Majapahit court in 1527. As a result of this event, only Blambangan in the eastern edge of Java, and Sunda in the western part remained Hindu kingdoms in Java. Meanwhile, in the land of Sunda, Muslim influences started to penetrate the kingdom.

==== Rise of Muslim Cirebon and Banten ====
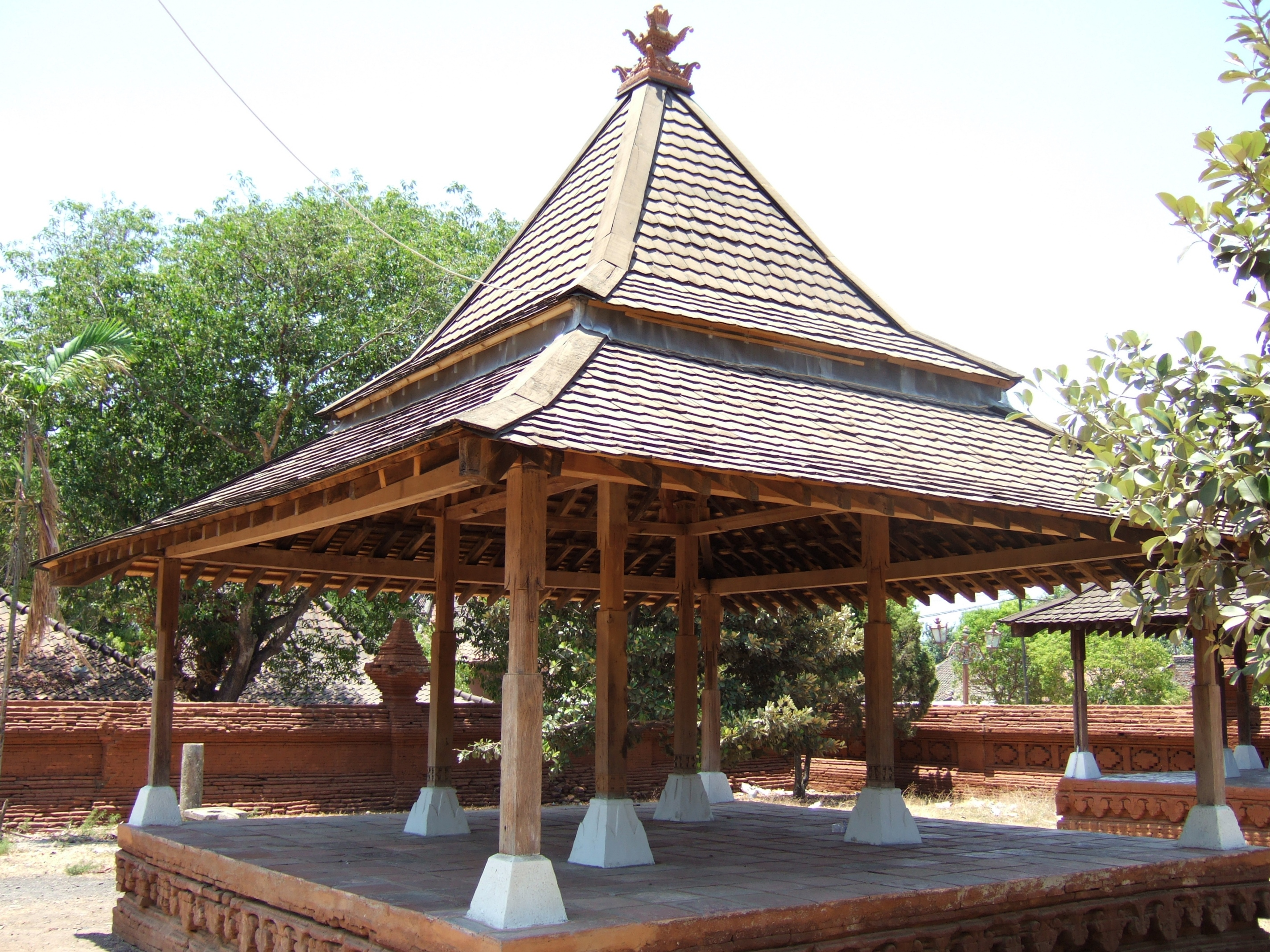
Keraton Kasepuhan of Cirebon. By 1482, the Sunda kingdom lost its important eastern port of Cirebon.

Bujangga Manik manuscript, written circa the second half of the 15th century AD reported that the eastern boundary of Sunda Kingdom realm was the Cipamali river in present-day Brebes. However, the Portuguese Suma Oriental in 1513 reported that the eastern border of Sunda Kingdom is located in the port of Chemano (Cimanuk), the estuarine of Manuk River. This means between 1450 and 1513 the kingdom has lost control of the area surrounding Cirebon, between Brebes and Indramayu on the northeastern part of the kingdom. This signifies the coastal Muslim Javanese push westward into once a traditional Sundanese territory, as Demak Sultanate was responsible as the patron for the rise of Cirebon.

The detail of the Sunda Kingdom and its relations with the rise of Cirebon Sultanate, mostly were taken from the account of Purwaka Caruban Nagari, a manuscript of Cirebon chronicle which claimed Cirebon as the rightful successor of Sunda Kingdom.

According to Purwaka Caruban Nagari, a Sunda king Prabu Siliwangi married Nyai Subang Larang, daughter of Ki Gedeng Tapa, port master of Muara Jati (today Cirebon). They had three children: Prince Walangsungsang, Princess Rara Santang, and Prince Kian Santang. Although Prince Walangsungsang was the first-born son of the King, the prince did not earn the right as a crown prince of Sunda Kingdom. This was because his mother, Nyai Subang Larang was not the queen consort. Another reason was because of his conversion to Islam, probably influenced by his mother as she is a Muslim. In the 16th century western Java, the prevalent faith practiced was Hinduism, Sundanese ancestral religion, and Buddhism. It was his half brother, Prabuwisesa, the king's son from his third wife Nyai Cantring Manikmayang, who was chosen as the crown prince.

Walangsungsang later moved to a settlement called Dukuh Alang-alang on 1445. After Ki Gedeng Alang-Alang's death in 1447, Walangsungsang appointed as the ruler of the town and established a court and assumed a new title as Prince Cakrabuana. King Siliwangi sent his envoy Tumenggung Jagabaya and Raja Sengara, to bestow Prince Carkrabuana with the title Tumenggung Sri Mangana. The settlement, now called Cirebon grew into a thriving port, yet Cakrabuana was still loyal to his father and sent tribute to the main court of Sunda. At that time Cirebon was still a principality within the Sunda Kingdom.

In 1479, Cakrabuana was succeeded by his nephew, Sharif Hidayatullah, the son of his sister Nyai Rara Santang. He married his cousin, Nyi Mas Pakungwati daughter of Cakrabuana. He is popularly known with his posthumously name Sunan Gunungjati. On 2 April 1482, Sunan Gunungjati stated that Cirebon will no longer send tribute to Pajajaran, which marked the proclamation that the Sultanate of Cirebon is independent from Sunda Pajajaran.

The character described in Purwaka Caruban Nagari, as Prabu Siliwangi, matched the historic character of Dewa Niskala or Ningrat Kancana, referred as Lord of Galuh in Carita Parahyangan. Tohaan di Galuh was the son and heir of Niskala Wastu Kancana.

The pressure from coastal Javan Islamic states drove the king of Sunda, Sri Baduga Maharaja, to seek assistance from the Portuguese at Malacca. In 1512 and again in 1521, he sent his son, the crown prince Surawisesa also known as Ratu Sang Hyang (Samian) to Malacca to request the Portuguese to sign an alliance treaty, to trade in pepper and to build a fort at his main port of Sunda Kalapa. Sunan Gunung Jati's son later also established the Sultanate of Banten, which later become a menace for the Hindu Sunda Kingdom.

==== Surawisesa and Sunda–Portuguese Treaty 1522 ====
After Sri Baduga Maharaja's death in 1521, the succeeding kings, Prabu Surawisesa Jayaperkosa, also known as Ratu Sang Hyang whom the Portuguese called Ratu Samian, faced the threat of Cirebon and Demak. Under this threat, Surawisesa, who reigned from 1521 to 1535, concluded the treaty with Portuguese from Malacca to establish a warehouse and fortress at Sunda Kelapa in return for protection against the threat of these Islamic Sultanates.

By 1522, the Portuguese were ready to form a coalition with the King of Sunda to get access to his lucrative pepper trade. The commander of Malacca, Jorge de Albuquerque, sent a ship, the São Sebastião, under Captain Henrique Leme, to Sunda Kalapa with valuable gifts for the king of Sunda. Two written sources describe the concluding of the treaty in detail, the original Portuguese document of 1522 with the text of the treaty and the signatories of the witnesses, and a report on that event by João de Barros in his book Da Ásia, printed after 1777/78.

The king welcomed them warmly upon their arrival. The crown prince had succeeded his father and was now King Prabu Surawisesa, although Barros called him King Samião. This Sunda ruler agreed to an arrangement of friendship with the King of Portugal and granted a fortress at the mouth of the Ciliwung River where the Portuguese could load as many peppers as they wished. In addition, he pledged, dating from the start of construction on the fortress, each year he would donate one thousand sacks of pepper to the Portuguese king. The contract document was drafted into two copies and signed. On the said day in 1522, Henrique Leme of Portuguese and his entourage together with deputies of the King of Sunda erected a commemoration stone at the mouth of the Ciliwung River.

==== The fall of Sunda Kalapa ====
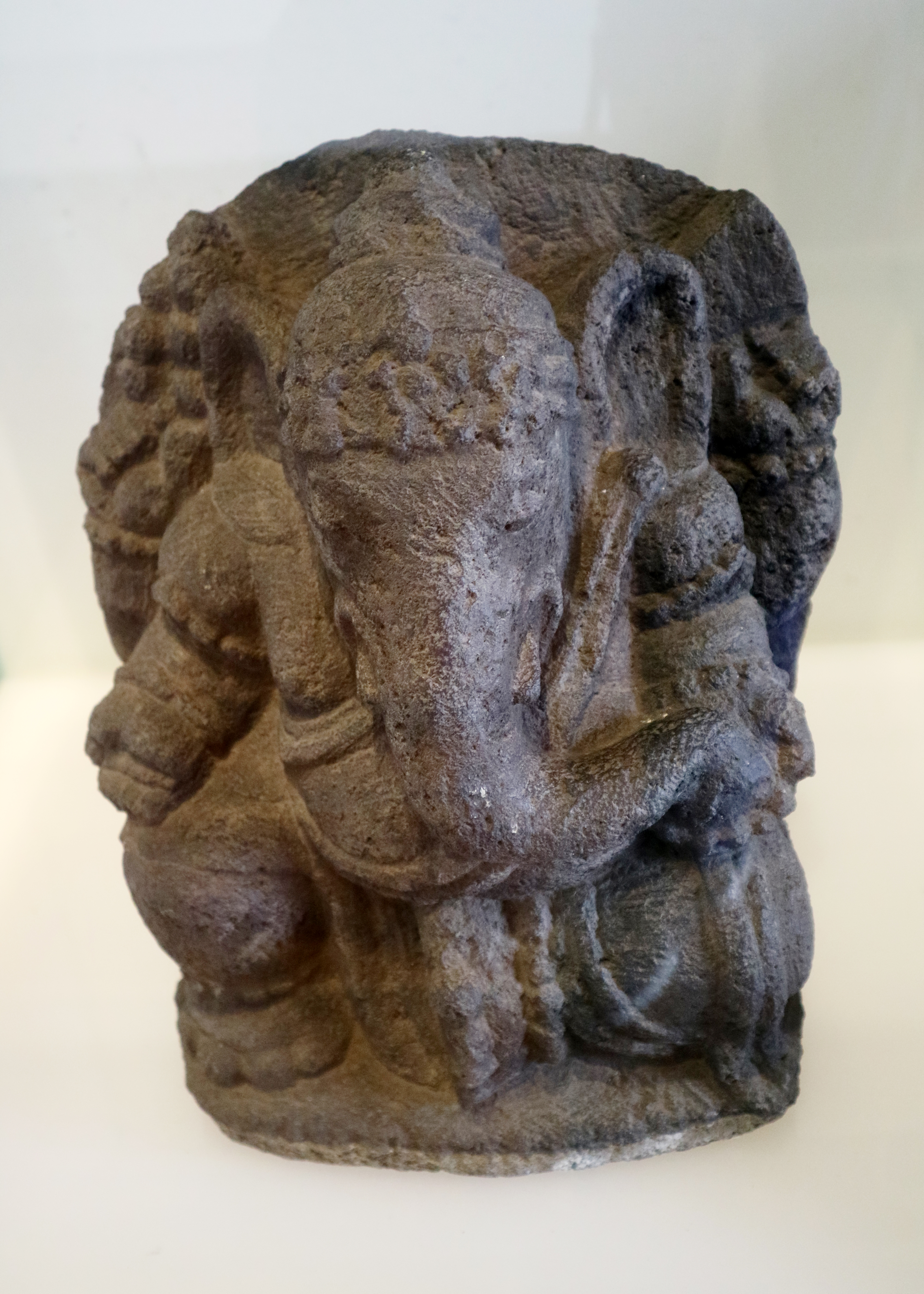
Statue of Ganesha, discovered in Warung Buncit, Pasar Minggu, South Jakarta, Sunda Kingdom period

This trade and defence treaty was fallen apart tremendously due to Portuguese failure to deliver their promise to construct the fortress in Kalapa. The delay was caused by troubles in Goa. To make things worse, in 1527 Fatahillah, a military commander sent from Demak, managed to capture the Sunda Kalapa harbour just before the Portuguese returned.

The army of Fatahillah, comprising around Cirebon-Demak troops, conquered Sunda Kalapa. The Sunda authority stationed in the port were fallen. The harbour chief and his family, the royal minister, and all of the people working in the harbour were slaughtered. The port city was completely destroyed and razed, as the Sundanese reinforcements sent from Pakuan was too weak and retreated. The Sunda Kingdom has lost its most important port, thus subsequently Sunda Kalapa was renamed Jayakarta by its Muslim conqueror.

Thirty Portuguese sailors, shipwrecked by storms, swam to the beach at Kalapa only to be killed by Fatahillah's men. The Portuguese recognised the political leadership had changed when they were not allowed to set foot on the land. As they were too weak for a battle, they set sail back to Malacca. The next year, a second attempt failed because of striking sailors angry at not having been paid.

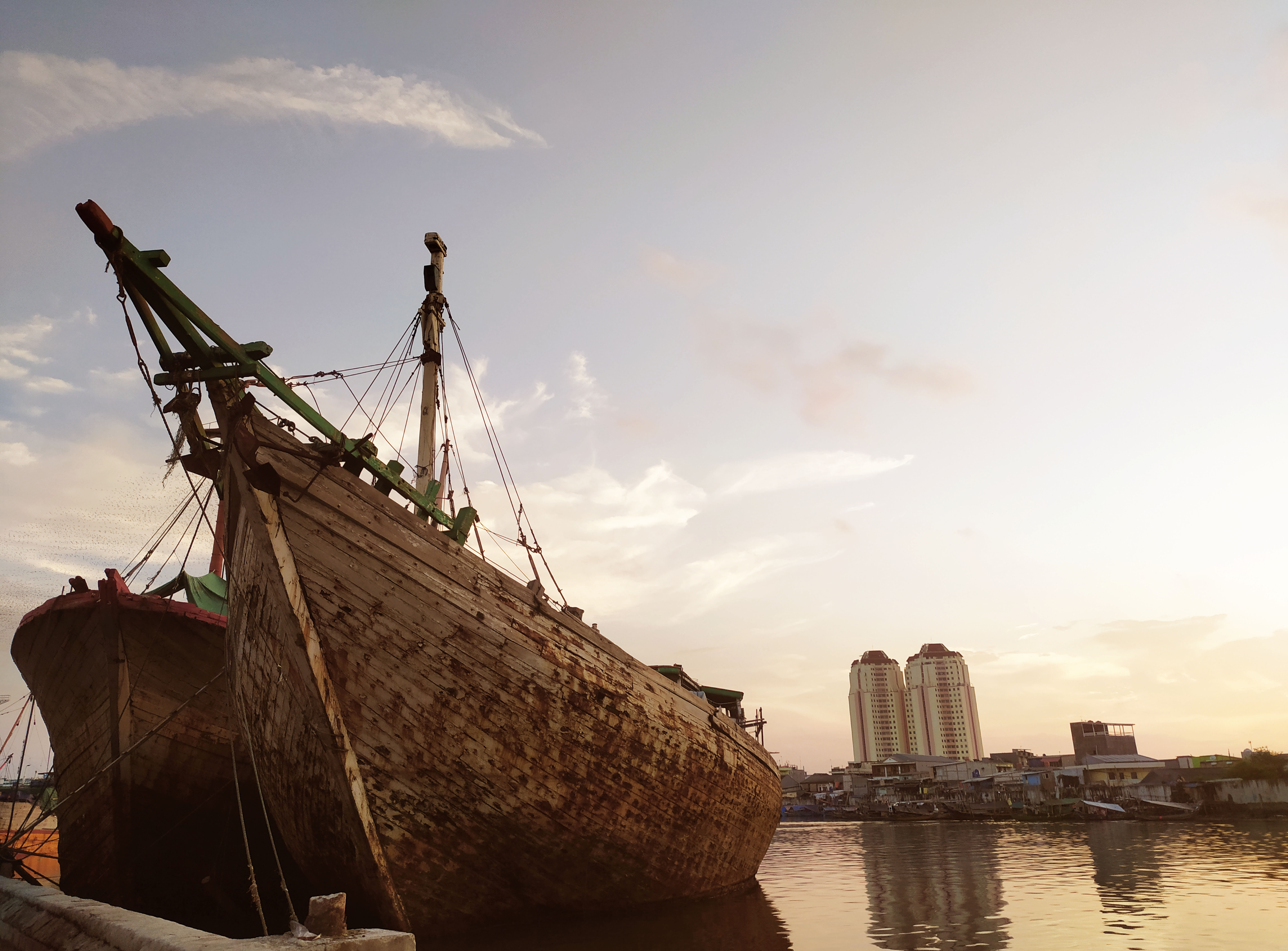
The port of Sunda Kalapa, the cradle of Jakarta. For centuries it was the royal port of Sunda Kingdom serving the capital Dayeuh Pakuan Pajajaran 60 kilometres inland to the south until it fell to Demak and Cirebon forces in 1527.

The failure to rely on Portuguese assistance has led Sunda to fend for their own survival by themselves. Carita Parahyangan mentioned that during his 14 years of reign (1521–1535), King Sang Hyang (Surawisesa) has fought in 15 battles. Unbeatable, all in which he managed to repel the series of invading Muslim forces from Cirebon and Demak. He fought in Kalapa, Tanjung, Ancol Kiji, Wahanten Girang, Simpang, Gunung Batu, Saung Agung, Rumbut, Gunung, Gunung Banjar, Padang, Panggoakan, Muntur, Hanum, Pagerwesi, and Medangkahyangan.

The war between Cirebon-Demak forces and the Sunda kingdom lasted for almost five years. The king lost thousands of his men. During this war, after Sunda Kalapa, Sunda Kingdom also lost the Port of Banten. Sunan Gunungjati of Cirebon later crowned his son, Hasanuddin, as the king of Banten under the auspices of the Sultan of Demak who, in turn, offered Hasanudin his sister's hand in marriage. Banten was established as the capital of this new sultanate, held as a vassal under Sultanate of Cirebon. Finally, in 1531, a peace treaty was concluded between King Surawisesa of Sunda and Syarif Hidayatullah of Cirebon.

In an apparent sorrow after the tremendous defeat and the loss of his two most important ports, Prabu Surawisesa established the Batutulis inscription in 1533 to commemorate his late father. This action was probably an attempt to spiritually appeal for ancestral guidance and protection against the powerful Muslim enemy that now loomed by the gates. Because of ongoing battles, he often could not stay in his palace in Pakuan Pajajaran.

==== Jaya Dewata ====
Prabu Ratu Dewata also known as Sang Ratu Jaya Dewata, was the successor of Prabu Surawisesa. He was, however, not his son. The reign of Prabu Ratu Dewata between 1535 and 1543 was known as a chaotic and difficult one full of hardship, as Islamic forces from Cirebon and Banten tried multiple times to capture the Dayeuh Pakuan capital.

During Ratu Dewata reign, the Carita Parahyangan reported several calamities befell the kingdom; there was a sudden attack, a lot of enemies razed the city, thus mass combat erupted in the grand yard (buruan ageung). In this battle, the noble princes were killed. The chaos has widespread across the kingdom, the attack also occurred in Ciranjang and Sumedang. Another terror was the assassination of the rishis, hermits and Hindu priests that resides in the hermitage sanctuaries. It was reported that the Hindu priests and hermits of mandala Jayagiri, were captured and drowned in the sea. It is highly possible that the attack was launched by Muslim states of Banten or Cirebon. This was a devastating attack straight to the spiritual core of the Sundanese Hindu community.

Unable to control the kingdom, instead of fulfilling his duty by maintaining the law and order, Prabu Ratu Dewata retreated himself to become a Raja Pandita (priestly king), submitted himself deeply into religious rituals as an apparently desperate appeal for gods' salvation. By this time, Sunda Kingdom were already isolated and confined to the inland.

==== Last kings and the fall of Sunda kingdom ====
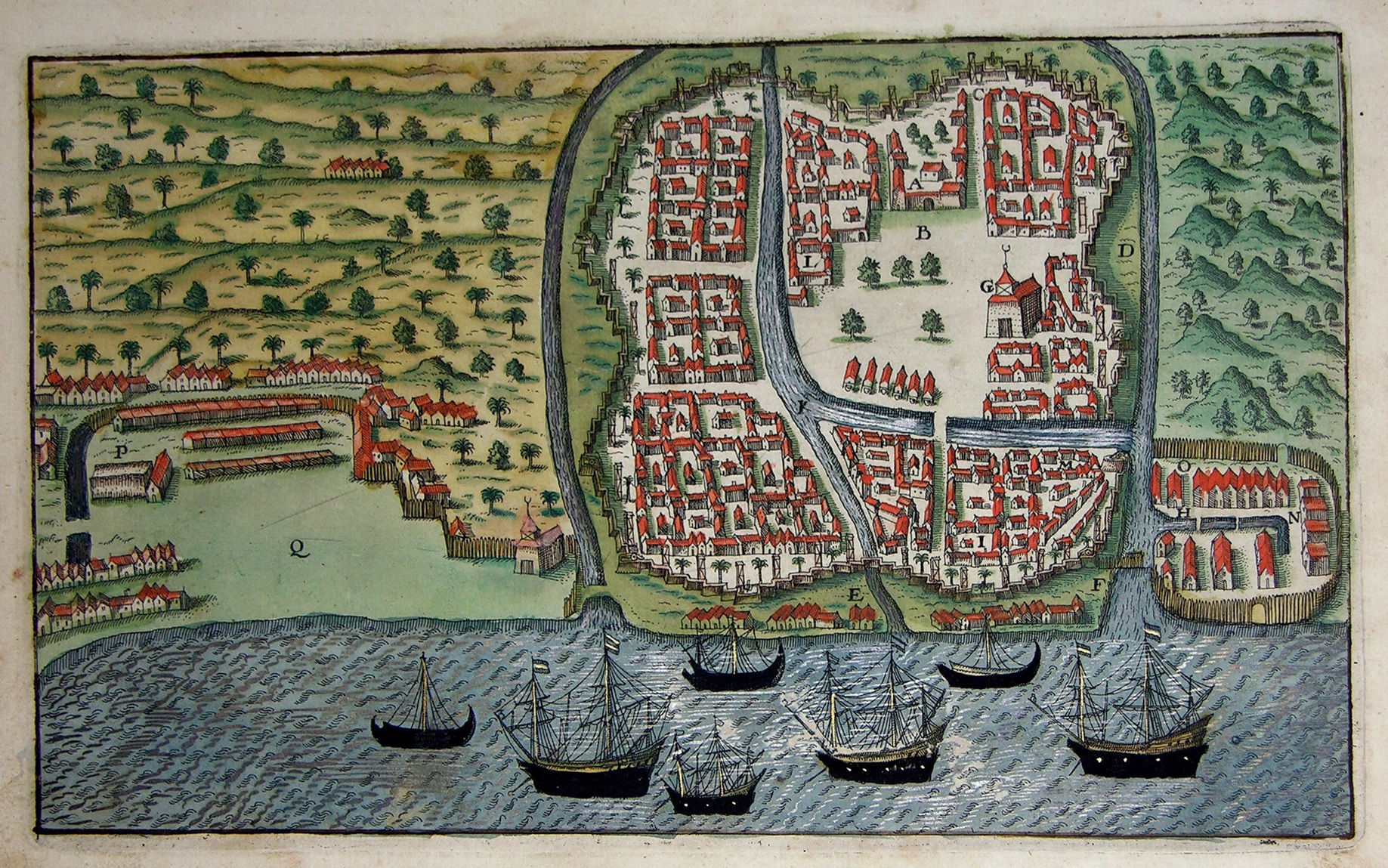
The Port of Banten in the 16th century. The Islamic Sultanate of Banten was responsible for the demise of Hindu Sunda Kingdom, and supplant it as the dominant polity in western parts of Java in the following centuries.

Series of last Sunda kings were notoriously known as incompetent rulers. The successor of Ratu Dewata, King Ratu Sakti reigned from 1543 to 1551, was known as a ruthless king, who indulges himself with sensual pleasure.

The next successor that ruled from 1551 to 1567, King Nilakendra, also known as Tohaan di Majaya, is also an incompetent ruler. Instead of fulfilling his duty as a king, he renovates and beautifies the palace. Squander kingdom's fortune by indulging himself in pleasures and luxury.

Because of ongoing battles, ironically Tohaan di Majaya could not stay in his newly renovated palace. The last kings of Sunda could no longer reside in Pakuan Pajajaran, since in the 1550s Hasanuddin, the sultan of Banten has launched a successful attack on Dayeuh Pakuan, captured and razed the capital.

The surviving Sunda royalties, nobles and common people fled the fallen city, heading to the mountainous wilderness. After the fall of Pakuan Pajajaran, the royal regalia of Sunda Kingdom was evacuated to the eastern principality of Sumedang Larang. Among these regalias are Makuta Binokasih Sanghyang Paké, the royal crown of Sunda. Thus the member of the Sunda dynasty established a surviving minor regional kingdom of Sumedang Larang where Sundanese aristocracy would survive for a few more centuries to come until conquered by Mataram Sultanate in the 17th century.

From 1567 to 1579, under the last king Raja Mulya, also known as Prabu Surya Kencana, the kingdom declined substantially. In Carita Parahyangan, his name is Nusiya Mulya. He ruled further inland in Pulasari, near Pandeglang, at the slope of Mount Palasari. The kingdom has fallen apart, particularly after 1576 due to constant pressure from Banten, and finally collapsed completely in 1579. Thereafter, the Sultanate of Banten took over most of the former Sunda Kingdom's territory, thus ultimately put an end to a millennium of Hindu-Buddhist Dharmic civilization of West Java. By this time, Java has turned more and more Islamic. Only the kingdom of Blambangan on the eastern edge was the last surviving Hindu kingdom in Java, well until its demise in the early 18th century.

== Capital ==
Throughout Sunda's history, the centre of cultural and political power often oscillated between the Western Priangan region; initially identified as "Sunda", and Eastern Priangan region; traditionally identified as "Galuh". The two traditional sites are located in and around modern Bogor city and the town of Ciamis. The two most important capitals are Pakuan Pajajaran, the capital of Sunda; and Kawali, the capital of Galuh.

=== Kawali ===
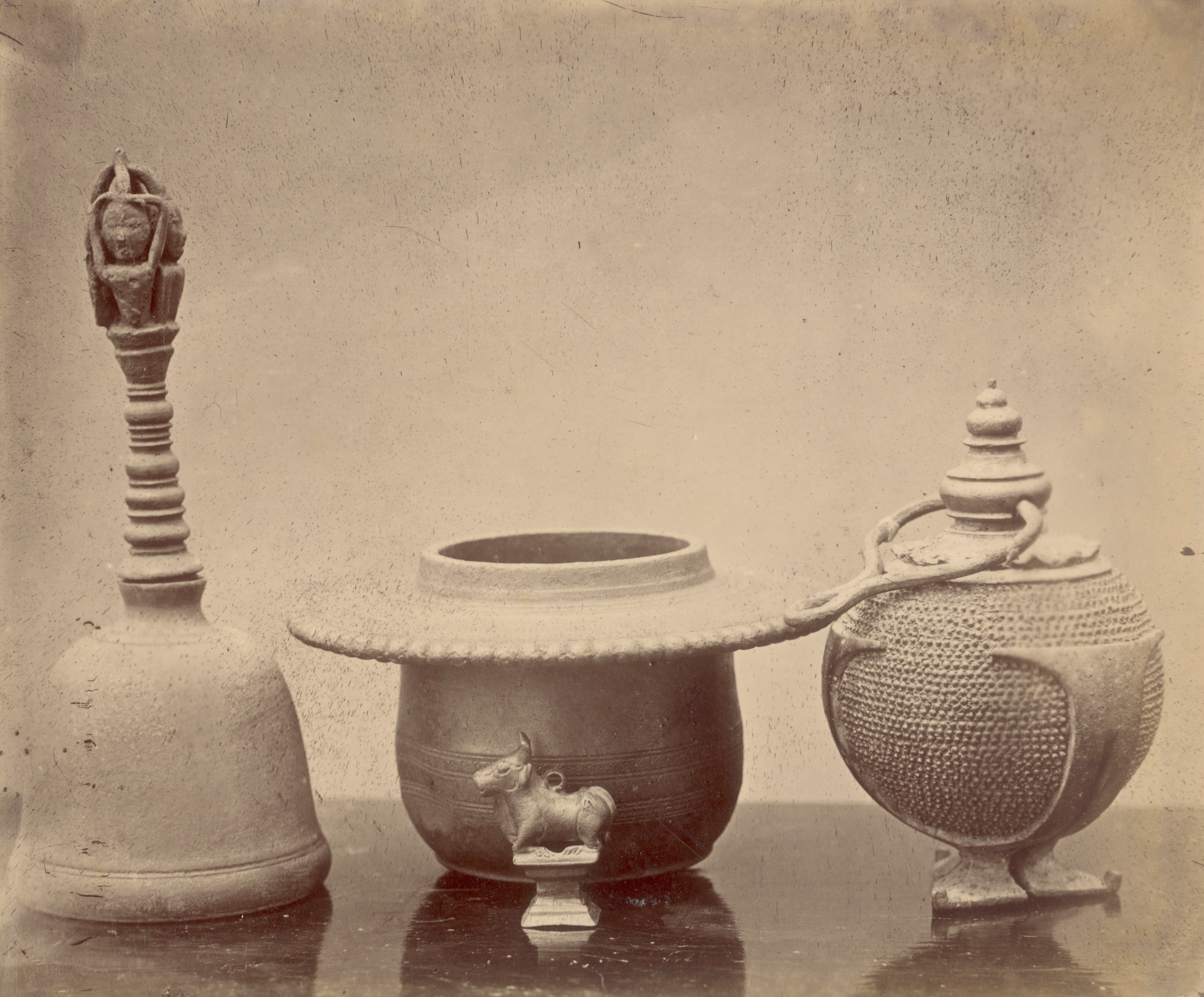
Hindu Brahmin's ritual objects, including bronze bell and holy water container from Kawali, the historic capital of Galuh Kingdom.

The capital of the Galuh Kingdom of the eastern Priangan region, has moved several times. In the older period, the capital was located around the Karang Kamulyan site by the banks of Citanduy river. By the early 14th century, the capital was moved further northwest upstream, in the area now known as Astana Gede, near the current town of Kawali, Ciamis Regency. The city was located on the eastern slope of Mount Sawal near the source of the Citanduy river. A Kawali inscription was discovered here. According to tradition, the keraton in Kawali is called Surawisesa, expanded and renovated by King Niskala Wastu Kancana. Kawali served as the capital of the kingdom for several generations until Sri Baduga Maharaja moved the government back to Pakuan in 1482.

=== Pakuan Pajajaran ===
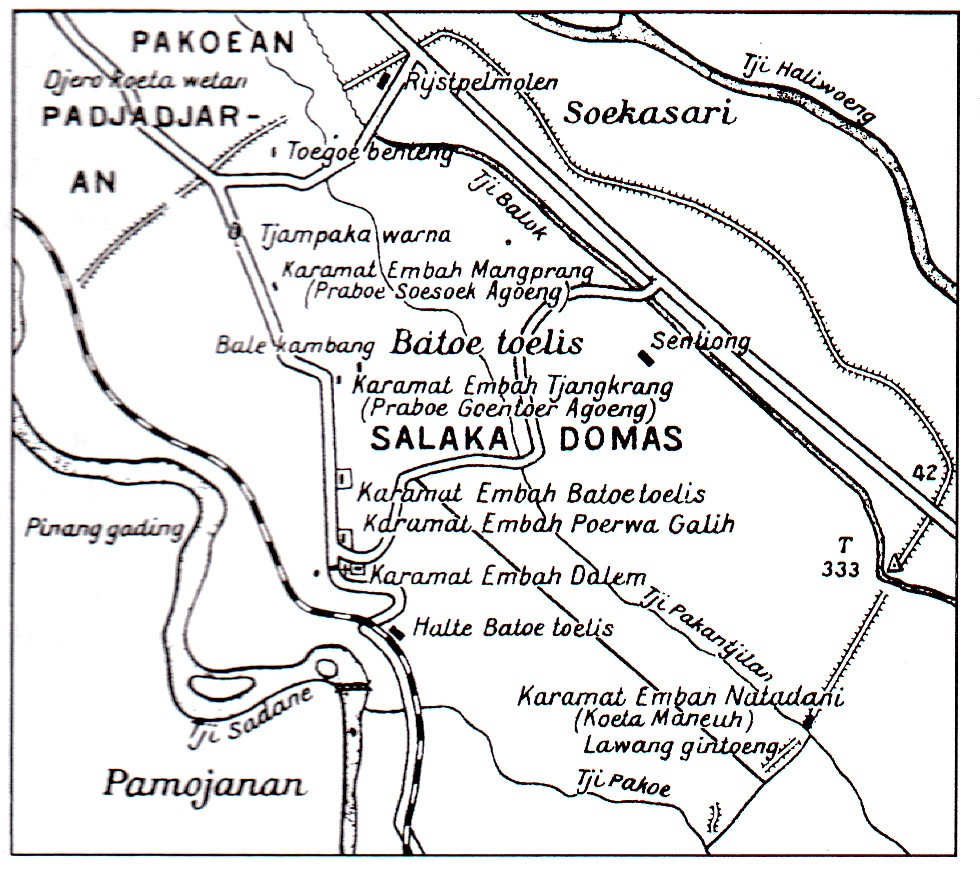
Location of Pakuan Pajajaran copied from book Kabudayaan Sunda Zaman Pajajaran Part 2 (2005).

After the fall of Tarumanagara in the 7th century, King Tarusbawa built a new capital city inland near the source of the Cipakancilan river in present-day Bogor. According to Carita Parahyangan, a manuscript from the 15th or 16th century, King Tarusbawa was only mentioned as Tohaan (Lord/King) of Sunda. He was the ancestor of a series of Sunda kings that reigned until 723 AD. Pakuan served as the capital of Sunda during the reign of several kings, and the court shifted to Kawali until Sri Baduga Maharaja moved the court from Kawali back to Pakuan in 1482.

The city was permanently settled since at least the 10th century, but not gaining major political importance until King Jayadewata established it as the royal capital of the Sunda kingdom in the 15th century. In 1513, the city was visited by its first European visitor, Tomé Pires, the Portuguese envoy. According to his report, the city of Daio (Dayeuh is a Sundanese term for "capital city") was great city, with population around 50,000 inhabitants.

The tradition hailed that King Jayadewata ruled justly from his beautiful Kadatwan (palace) called Sri Bima Punta Narayana Madura Suradipati at Pakuan Pajajaran, and his reign is celebrated as the golden age for Sundanese people.

After the reign of King Jayadewata (Sri Baduga Maharaja), Pakuan Pajajaran served as the royal capital for several generations. Dayeuh Pakuan Pajajaran served as the capital of the Sunda Kingdom for almost a hundred years (1482 – 1579), until it was razed and destroyed by the Sultanate of Banten in 1579.

Because Pakuan, the capital city of the Sunda kingdom laid between two parallel rivers, Ciliwung and Cisadane, it was called Pajajaran (lit. place laid between two parallel things) or Pakuan Pajajaran. Although primary local and European historical records referred to the kingdom in the western part of Java island as the Sunda Kingdom, the Sundanese, especially after the establishment of the Sultanate of Banten and Cirebon, referred to the kingdom (minus the coastal sultanates) as "Pakuan Pajajaran" Kingdom, or simply as the Pakuan Kingdom or the Pajajaran Kingdom. The later name – Pajajaran – is more familiar for people residing in West Java and the Javanese of Mataram region (current Yogyakarta and Solo).

== Government and economy ==
=== Administration ===
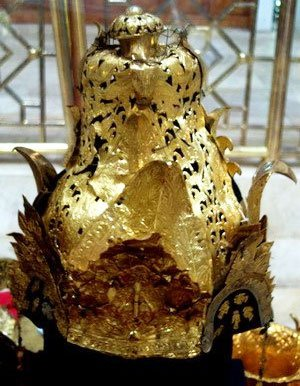
Makuta Binokasih Sanghyang Paké, the royal crown of Sunda kingdom. After the fall of Pajajaran to Banten, the crown was evacuated to Sumedang Larang and become their regalia.

In many historical sources, including manuscripts, inscriptions, as well as foreign historical accounts from China and Portuguese reports, all refer to "Sunda" as a kingdom. On the other hand, the term "Pakuan" and "Pajajaran" or "Dayeuh" refer to its capital which corresponds to the modern city of Bogor. The tangible evidence on the existence of a kingdom as an administrative social structure, was found in Sanghyang Tapak inscription dated 952 Saka (1030), that mentioned Prahajyan Suṇḍa (Sunda Kingdom), with Sri Jayabhupati claimed as haji ri Suṇḍa (the king of Sunda).

Through the study on the 14th century inscriptions in Astana Gede site in Kawali, historian suggests that the political model of Sunda Kingdom adhered the concept of Tri Tangtu di Buana, which administrative power was distributed in triad among three elements; Prebu (king), Rama (village chief or regional elder) and Resi (rishi priestly class of religious authority).

According to Tomé Pires (1513), the Sunda kingdom is ruled by a paramount raja (king or monarch), and the right of the throne inheritance descended from a father to his son. However, in the case when a king did not produce a male heir, the successor is elected from the lesser kings, the rulers of regional towns or provinces. These lesser kings are called Tohaan (lord) that acts as local governor, and most are related to the king, which means they belong in the same dynasty.

Much of our current knowledge on detailed social order and the bureaucracy structure of the kingdom, is owed to the Sundanese manuscript of Sanghyang siksakanda ng karesian, compiled around 1518.

...nihan sinangguh dasa prebakti ngaranya. Anak bakti di bapa, ewe bakti di laki, hulun bakti di pacandaan, sisya bakti di guru, wong tani bakti di wado, wado bakti di mantri, mantri bakti di nu nangganan, nu nangganan bakti di mangkubumi, mangkubumi bakti di ratu, ratu bakti di dewata, dewata bakti di hyang ...
This is a reminder which is called "Ten bhakti (devotion)": sons (children) devoted to (their) father, wife devoted to husband, the common people (servants or slaves) devoted to (their) master or employer (pacandaan = place to lean on), students devoted to (their) guru (teacher), farmers devoted to wado (lesser employee), wado devoted to mantri (government official), mantri devoted to nu nangganan (lit. "handler", which refer to managerial position in bureaucracy), nu nagganan devoted to mangkubumi (lord or governor), mangkubumi devoted to ratu (king or monarch), the king devoted to dewata (gods), dewata devoted to hyang (higher spirit).

— Sanghyang siksakanda ng karesian

According to Carita Parahyangan, all regional ruler (governor), rama (village chief), government officials, and rishi (Hindu priests), are required to make a formal annual visit to the capital; paying homage, tax or tribute to the court. As mentioned in some fragments of this manuscript:
"..., ti Kandangwesi pamwat siya ka Pakwan..." ("... from Kandangwesi the tribute was sent to Pakuan"),
"..., anaking sang Prebu Rama, Resi samadaya sarerea siya marek ka Pakwan unggal tahun..." ("... my son the chief of the village, the rishis together all paid a visit to Pakuan every year").

=== Economy ===
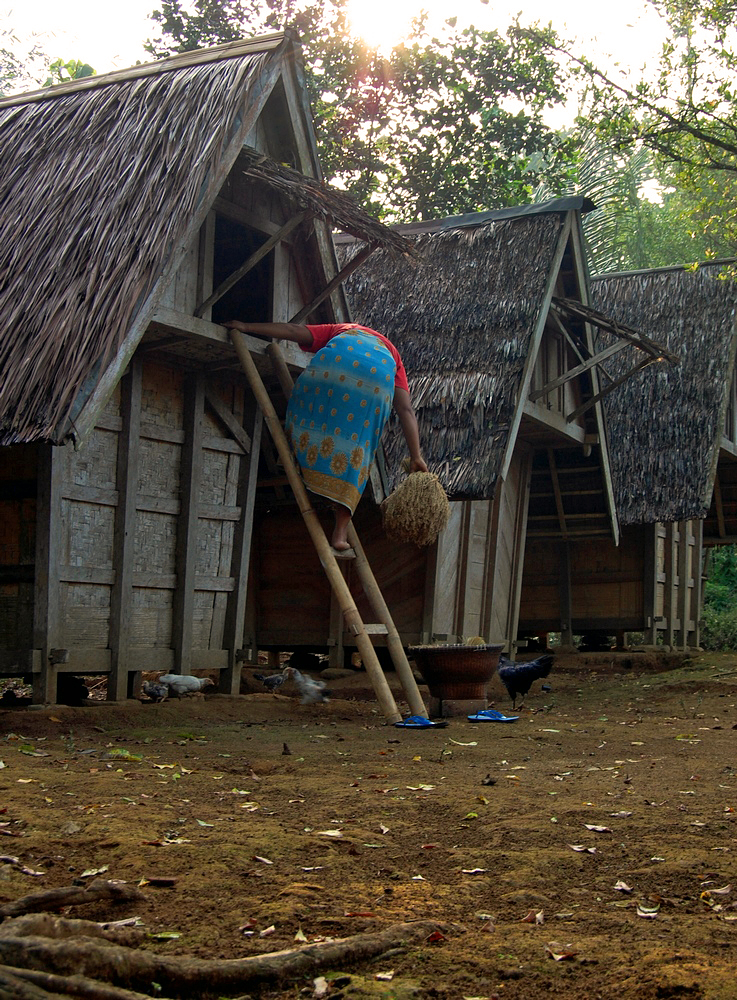
A Sundanese woman retrieving rice from a leuit, Sundanese economy mainly rely on rice agriculture

The economy of the Sunda kingdom relied on agriculture, especially rice cultivation; this is reflected in Sundanese culture and the annual ceremonies of crop seeding and Seren Taun rice harvest festival. The harvest ceremony also allowed the king's official to collect tax in the form of rice that can be stored in the state's Leuit (rice barn).

According to Siksakanda ng Karesian, Sundanese farmers during the era of the Sunda Kingdom did recognize sawah or the wet-field rice cultivation. However, the widespread rice cultivation system applied in the kingdom seems to be the ladang or the dry-field rice which is a much simpler form of cultivation that doesn't require an elaborate social structure to support it. This corresponds with the geography and topography of West Java which dominated by the central Parahyangan Plateau, in contrast with Central and East Java that consists of river valleys between volcanoes. As the result, compared to Central and East Java, West Java at that time was more sparsely populated, consists of settlements, villages or hamlet quite isolated deep within highland valleys, which render direct administrative control from the kingdom's central government rather difficult.

The kingdom was also well known as the world's main producer of high quality pepper. The kingdom participated in a spice trade network in the archipelago. The ports of Sunda participated in international trades in the region.

In Suma Oriental, written in 1512–1515, Tomé Pires, a Portuguese explorer report about the ports of Sunda:

First the king of Çumda (Sunda) with his great city of Dayo, the town and lands and port of Bantam, the port of Pomdam (Pontang), the port of Cheguide (Cigede), the port of Tamgaram (Tangerang), the port of Calapa (Kelapa), and the port of Chemano (Chi Manuk or Cimanuk), this is Sunda, because the river of Chi Manuk is the limit of both kingdoms.

Another Portuguese explorer, Diogo do Couto, wrote that the Sunda kingdom is thriving and abundant; it lies between Java and Sumatra, separated from the latter by the Sunda Strait. Many islands lie along the coast of this kingdom within the strait, for nearly the space of forty leagues; the strait's widest point is about twenty-five and narrowest point only twelve leagues broad. Bantam is about the midpoint. All the islands are well timbered but have little water. A small one called Macar, at the entrance of Sunda Strait, is said to have much gold.

He also noted that the principal ports of the Sunda kingdom were Banten, Ache, Chacatara (Jakarta), which annually receive twenty sommas, ships from Chienheo, China, to ship the eight thousand bahars, which are equal to 3,000,000 kg of pepper the kingdom produced.

Bantam is situated at 6° south latitude, in the middle of a bay, three leagues from point to point. The town is eight hundred and fifty fathoms in length, and the seaport extends about 400. A river capable of admitting junks and galleys flows through the middle of the town: a small branch of this river admits boats and small craft.

There is a brick fort, the walls of which are seven palms thick, with wooden bulwarks, armed with two tiers of artillery. The anchorage is good, with a muddy or sandy bottom and a depth from two to six fathoms.

== Territories ==
Based on the primary manuscript in Ancient Sundanese, Bujangga Manik (which tells the story of Bujangga Manik's journey, a Sundanese Hinduism priest who visited Hindu holy places on the islands of Java and Bali in the early 16th century), which is currently kept in the Boedlian Library, Oxford University in England since 1627, the boundary of the Sunda Kingdom to the east is Ci Pamali (Pamali River) and Ci Serayu (Serayu River) in Central Java province. Meanwhile, the vassal territory of the Sunda Kingdom stretched from the western tip at Pasar Talo, Bengkulu to Jatimalang, Purworejo at the eastern tip. The Sunda Kingdom, whose capital was Pakuan Pajajaran, also covered the southern part of the island of Sumatra (Ulubelu inscription). After the Sunda Kingdom was destroyed by the Sultanate of Banten, power over the southern region of Sumatra and the western part of Java was continued by the Sultanate of Banten.

== Culture and society ==
=== Religion ===
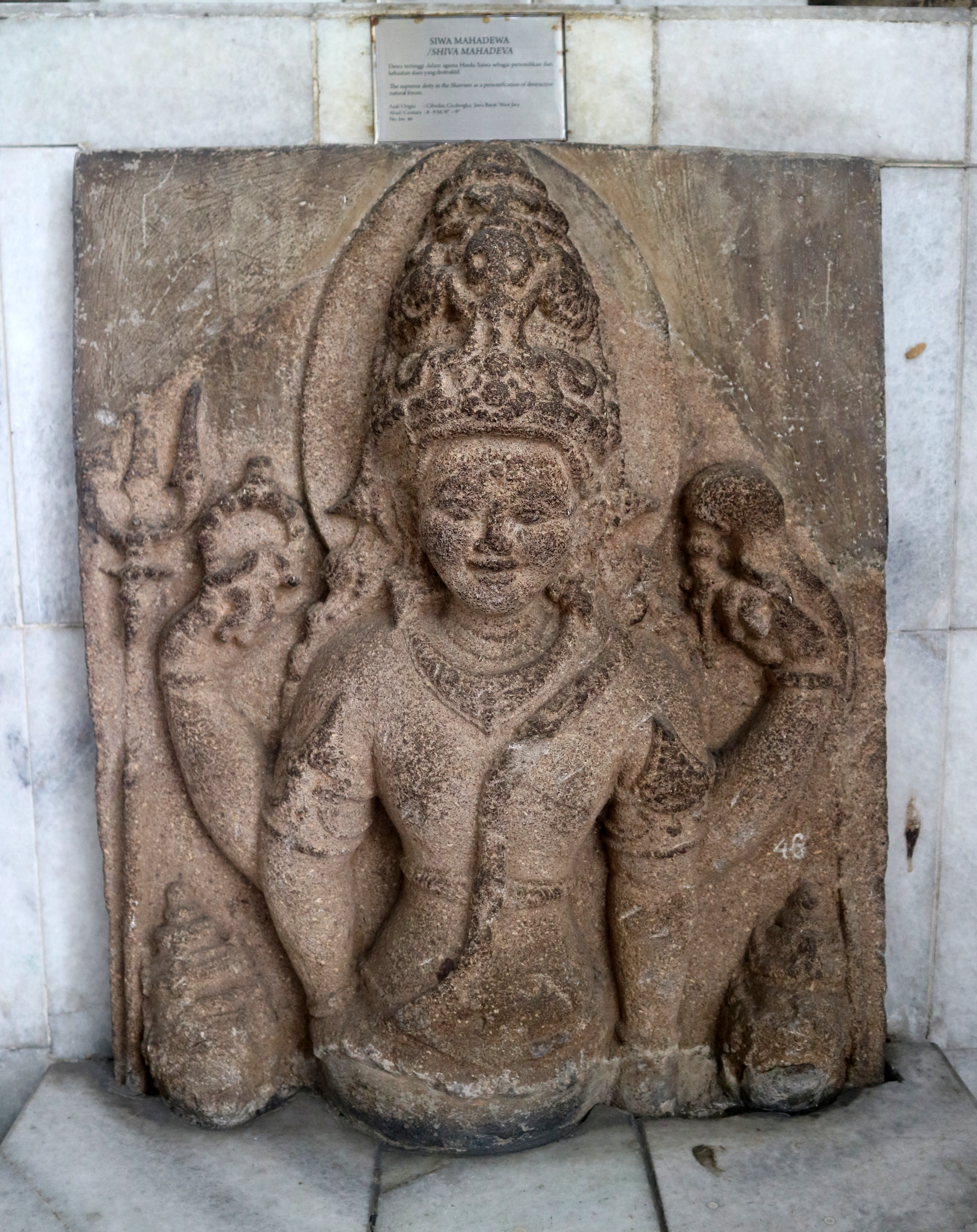
The statue of Shiva Mahadeva from Cibodas village, Cicalengka Subdistrict, Bandung Regency, West Java. Possibly from the Sunda Kingdom period 8th to 9th century.

Hinduism was one of the earliest religious influences established in West Java since the era of Tarumanagara, circa early 5th century AD. In fact, West Java was one of the earliest places in Indonesia that being Indianized, also sparked the historic period of Indonesian history by producing the earliest inscription in Java. As Tarumanagara's successor, Sunda Kingdom has inherited this Hindu civilization influences.

The culture of the people in the Sunda kingdom blends Hinduism with Sunda Wiwitan; a native shamanism belief, and also a traces of Buddhism is observable. Several intact prehistoric megalithic sites, such as Cipari site in Kuningan and the Pangguyangan menhir and stepped pyramid in Cisolok, Sukabumi, suggest that native shamanic animism and dynamism beliefs coexisted with Hinduism and Buddhism. The native belief, Sunda Wiwitan, persists today as a way of life for the Baduy or Kanekes people who resist Islam and other foreign influences.

The Cangkuang Hindu temple in Leles, Garut, dated from the 8th century AD, was dedicated to Shiva and built during the Galuh kingdom. Buddhist influence came to West Java through the Srivijaya conquest, as the empire dominated West Java until the 11th century. The brick stupas in Batujaya indicate Buddhist influence in West Java, while nearby Cibuaya sites show Hindu influence.

The manuscript Carita Parahyangan clearly demonstrate Hinduism spirituality within the Sunda Kingdom society. This manuscript is opened with a legendary character named Sang Resi Guru that had a son named Rajaputra. Comprehensively the manuscript was written by a Hindu scholar which demonstrate the Hindu frame of references. The Hindu pantheon, such as Brahma, Vishnu, Mahesvara, Rudra, Sadasiva, Yama, Varuna, Kuvera, Indra and Besravaka, were also mentioned in the ancient Sundanese manuscript of Sewakadharma or also known as Serat Dewabuda, dated 1357 Saka (1435).

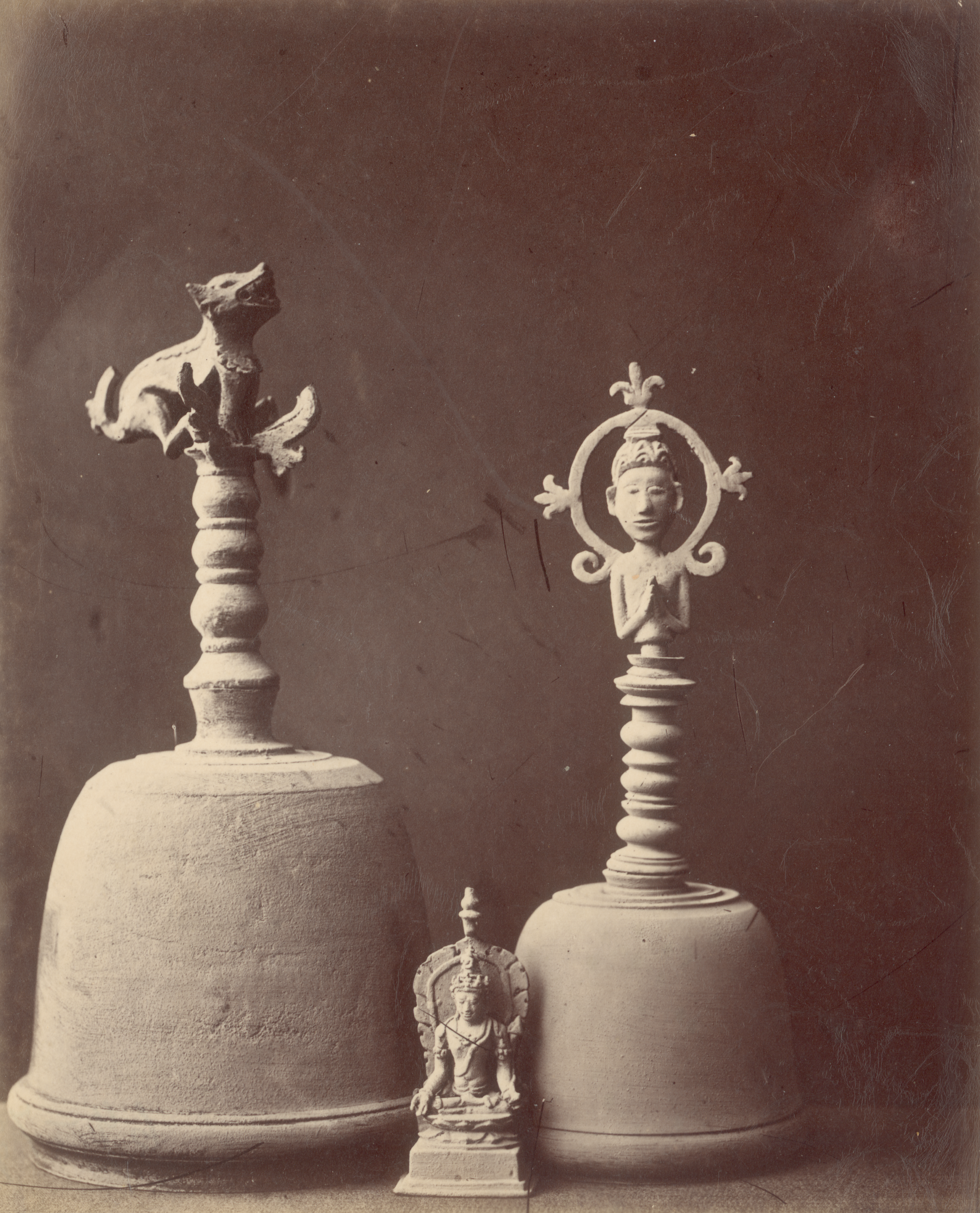
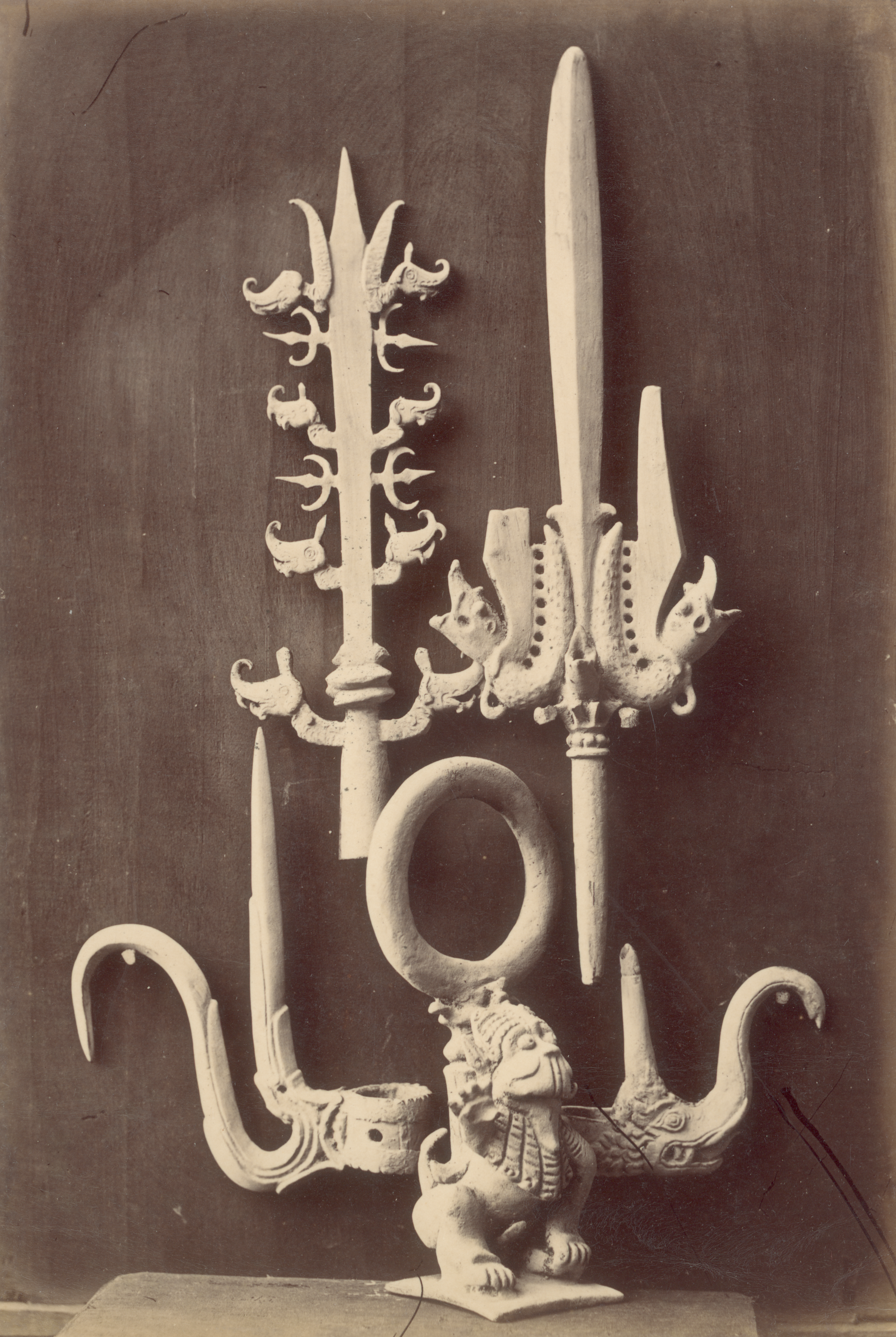
Hindu ritual objects; bells, small statue, trishula and ornament of a ritual staff made of bronze, from Talaga near Kuningan, West Java. These objects belonged to Brahmin Hindu priests. Hinduism was the dominant faith in the Sunda Kingdom.

The Sundanese manuscript of spiritual guidance, the Sanghyang Siksakanda ng Karesian also demonstrate Hinduism religious outlook and frame of references, although it seems already mixed with some sorts of Buddhism spirituality. " ... ini na lakukeuneun, talatah sang sadu jati. Hongkara namo Sewaya, sembah ing hulun di Sanghyang Panca Tatagata; panca ngaran ing lima, tata ma ngaran ing sabda, gata ma ngaran ing raga, ya eta ma pahayueun sareanana .., ", " ... this has to be done, the true mandate of the good-hearted (or trusted one). Blessed (should be) in the name of Shiva. Worship the servant to Sanghyang Panca Tatagata (Buddha), panca means five, tata means words, gata means body, yes, that is for the good of all".

Sunda Kingdom period did not produce enough archaeological evidence and records that could give comprehensive knowledge about the religious aspects of its population. Yet, there are few interesting things that suggest a syncretism took place between Hinduism, Buddhism, and a form of local beliefs system. This indication emerged from the veneration of Hyang figure, which considered possess higher status than Hindu-Buddhist deities, as it is shown in Sanghyang Siksakanda Ng Karesian manuscript (1518): "...mangkubumi bakti di ratu, ratu bakti di dewata, dewata bakti di hyang...", which means "...mangkubumi submit to the king, king submit to the gods, and gods submit to hyang..."

Ancient Sundanese society did not build temples that are meticulously decorated with exquisite bas-reliefs as demonstrated in temples built by neighbouring Javanese in central and east Java that flourished around the same era. Furthermore, their statuary such as Shiva from Cangkuang temple and Ganesha from the Karang Kamulyan site were made such in a very simple form, almost has primitive megalithic style and quality. This has led to the suggestion that Hinduism and Buddhism were not truly and fully embraced by the ancient Sundanese populace because they still rather faithfully adhered to their own vernacular ancestral beliefs system.

=== Art and culture ===
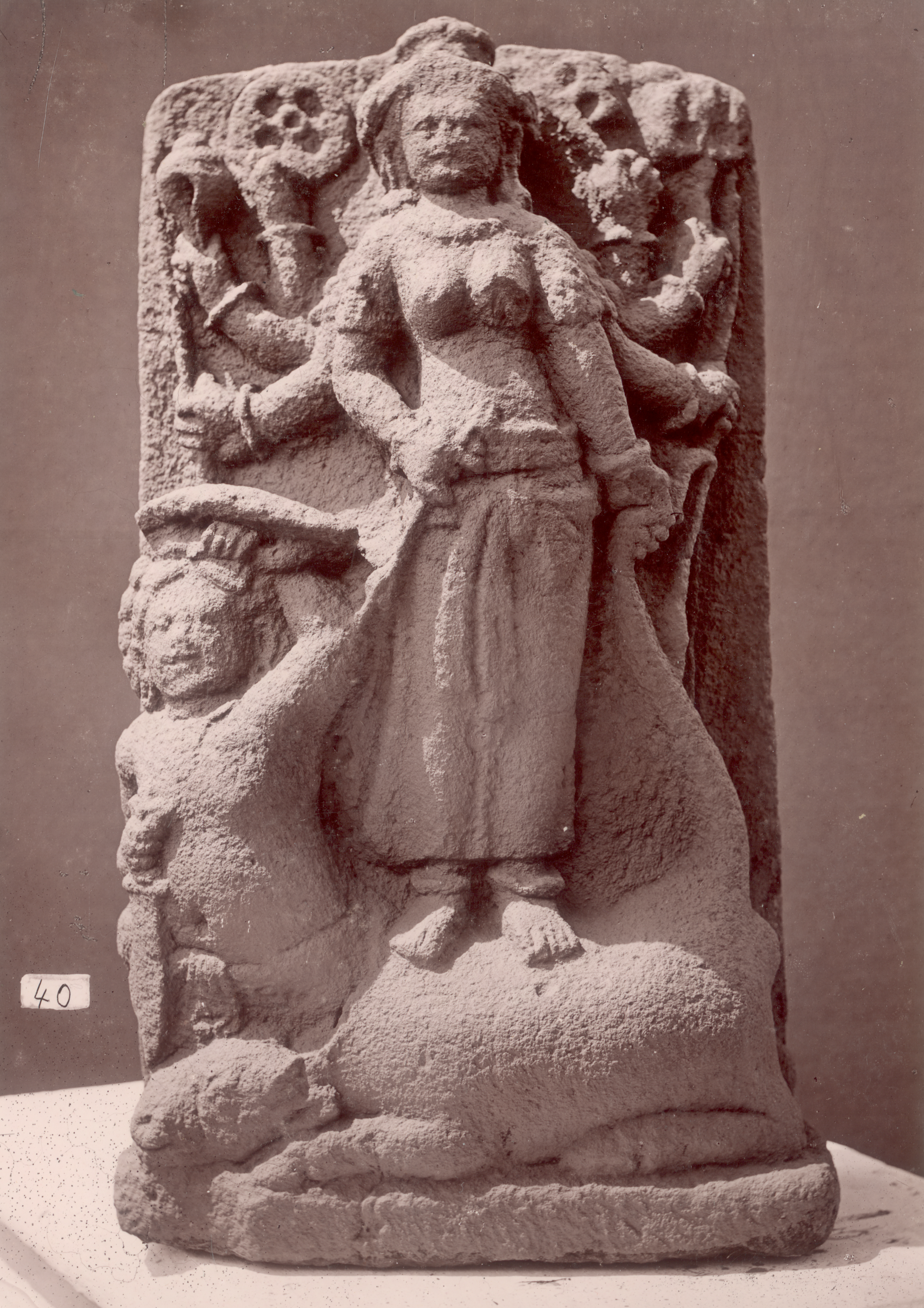
Statue of Durga from Bandung, West Java

The culture of the Sunda kingdom centred on agricultural activity, especially rice cultivation. Nyi Pohaci Sanghyang Asri or Sanghyang Asri, the goddess of rice, is revered as the main deity or the highest goddess within Sundanese pantheon. The priest was concerned about the religious ceremonies and the king and his subjects participated in annual ceremonies and festivals such as the blessing of the rice seeds ceremonies and harvest festival. The annual Seren Taun rice harvest festival is still practised today in traditional Sundanese communities.

According to the Bujangga Manik manuscript, the courtly culture of Sunda kraton and its nobles' etiquette in Pakuan Pajajaran was sophisticated. However, no traces of the palace or buildings survived in the former capital, probably because their wood construction decayed over the centuries.

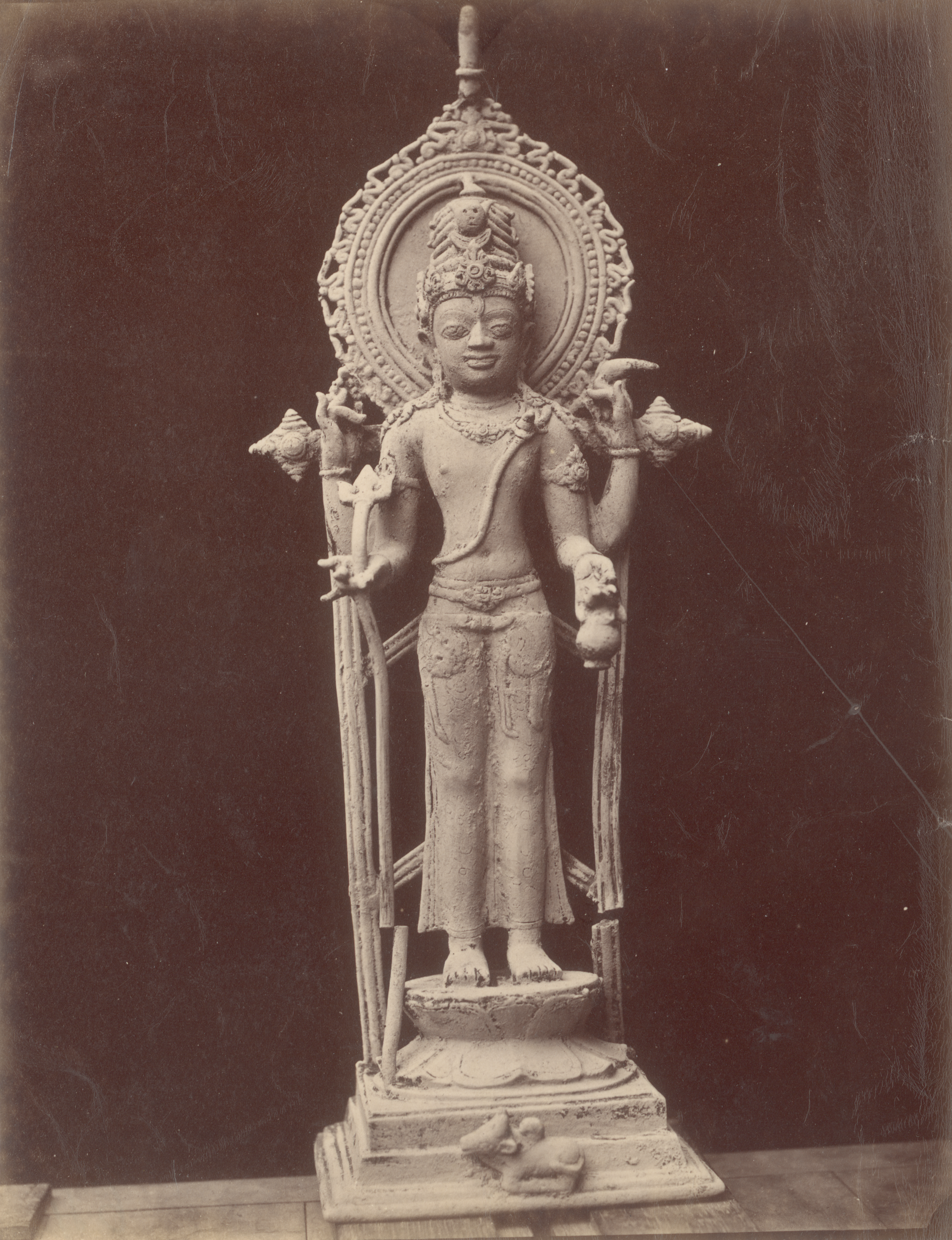
A bronze statue of Hindu god Shiva discovered in Talaga near Kuningan, West Java. Sunda kingdom period, circa 14th century.

The Portuguese source provide a glimpse of the culture and customs of the Sunda kingdom. In his report “Suma Oriental (1512–1515)” Tomé Pires wrote:

Sunda kingdom is very rich. The land of Sunda has as much as four thousands horses that come there from Priaman (Sumatera) and other islands to be sold. It has up to forty elephants; these are for the king’s array. An inferior gold, of six carats, is found. There is an abundance of tamarinds that serve the native for vinegar.

The city where the king is most of the year is the great city of Dayo. The city has well-built houses of palm leaf and wood. They say that the king’s house has three hundred and thirty wooden pillars as thick as a wine cask, and five fathoms (8 m) high, and beautiful timber work on the top of the pillars, and a very well-built house. The city is two days journey from the chief port, which is called Kalapa.

The people of the sea coast get along well with the merchants in the land. They are accustomed to trading. These people of Sunda very often come to Malacca to trade. They bring cargo lancharas, ships of a hundred and fifty tons. Sunda has up to six junks and many lancharas of the Sunda kind, with masts like a crane, and steps between each so that they are easy to navigate.

Pires noted that the kingdom was governed through a hereditary monarchy passed from father to son, overseeing the capital of Dayo (Pakuan Pajajaran) and major coastal ports including Bantam (Banten), Pontang, Cheguide (Cigede), Tangaram (Tangerang), Calapa (Sunda Kalapa), and Chi Manuk (Cimanuk). In his account, he characterised the Sundanese populace as honest and well-governed, describing the reigning king as an avid hunter and sportsman.

Observing Sundanese social and religious customs from a 16th-century European perspective, Pires further noted the existence of female monastic communities (convents) where noble families sent unmarried daughters, as well as the practice of widow suicide (sati) among high-ranking women upon their husbands' deaths, noting that those who declined the practice entered convents instead. He also remarked on the inhabitants' strong devotion to their indigenous and Hindu-Buddhist religious traditions, and observed that while he considered them less warlike than neighbouring peoples, they placed high value on finely crafted weaponry, such as kris daggers and lances inlaid with gold.

== Relations with regional powers ==
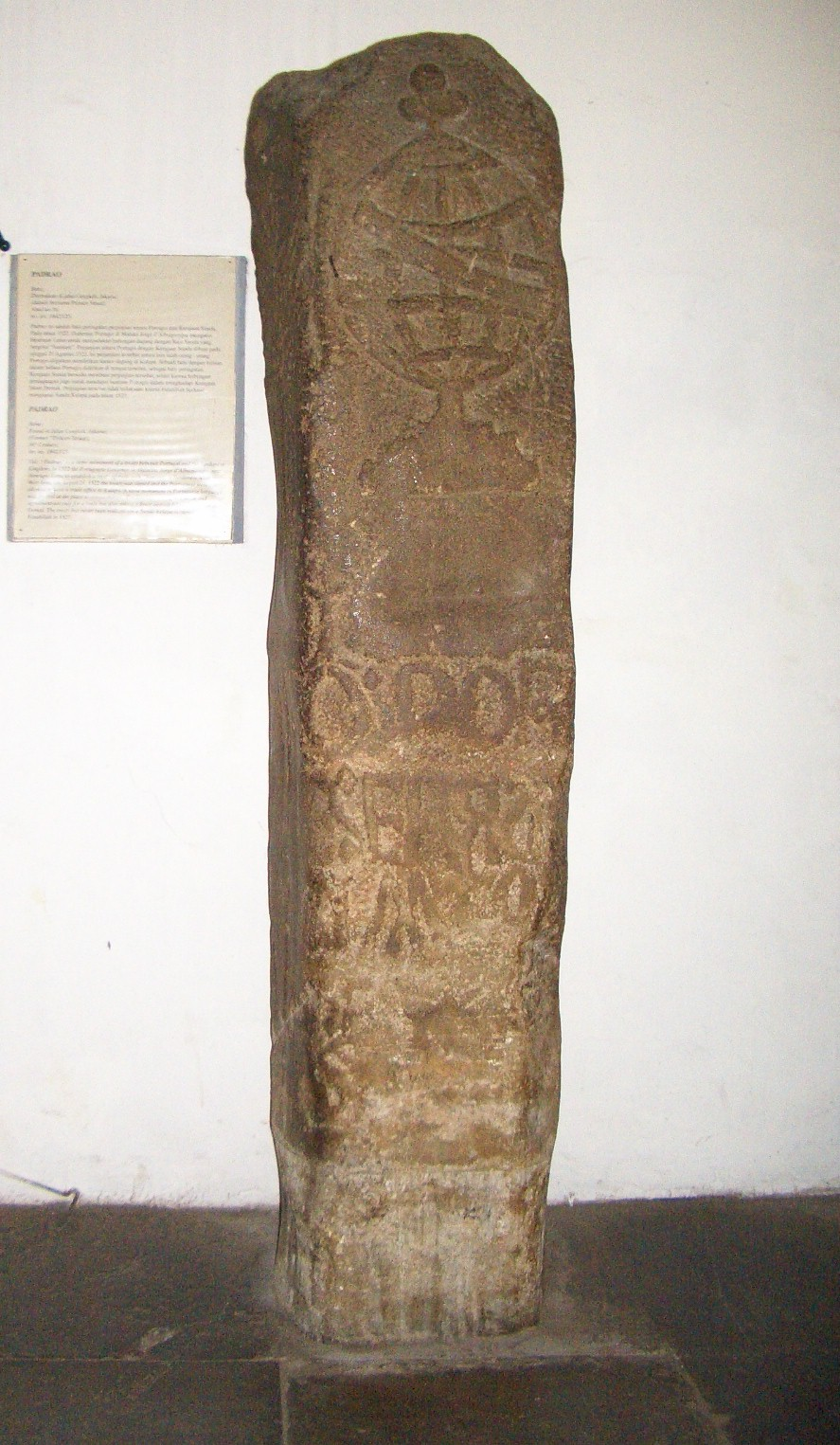
Padrão of Sunda Kalapa (1522), a stone pillar with a cross of the Order of Christ commemorating a treaty between Portuguese Kingdom and Hindu Sunda Kingdom, at National Museum of Indonesia, Jakarta.

The Kingdom is commonly thought of as the successor of Tarumanagara which also flourished in the same location of Western Java. It seems that in its early history, around the 10th to 11th century, Sunda Kingdom was stuck in between two competing mandalas; the Malay Srivijaya in Sumatra in the west and its Javanese neighbouring kingdom in the east.

In early of its history, the kingdom seems served as the vassal of Srivijayan mandala. By the 10th century AD, the kingdom seems to break loose, liberated from the Srivijayan mandala as stated by Rakryan Juru Pangambat inscription (932 AD). However, according to the Chinese Song dynasty book Zhu Fan Zhi, written around 1225 by Zhao Rugua, Sin-t'o (Sunda), was still part of San-fo-tsi (Srivijaya) 15 tributaries.

The Kingdom of Sunda has established relations with its eastern neighbour; the kaleidoscope of Javanese kingdoms, from the era of Mataram kingdom back in the 8th century, all the way to Majapahit in the 14th century and Demak in the 16th century. The popular hero, King Sanjaya of Mataram known as the Javanese Mataram King mentioned in Canggal inscription (732 AD), was also mentioned in Sundanese manuscript Carita Parahyangan; as having his root in the Sunda Kingdom.

The Sanghyang Tapak inscription (1030) shows Javanese cultural influence, as the style of script, letters, language, and the title of the king is similar to royal names in East Javanese Mataram court. However, the relations might be not quite harmonious, as according to 11th century East Javanese Horren inscription, mentioned çatru Sunda, which means the village of Horren was attacked by "the enemy (from) Sunda".

The relations between Sundanese and Javanese kingdoms descended to a new low, when a disastrous incident took place in Bubat square in Majapahit in 1357, killing all of the Sundanese royal party, including the Sunda king Prabu Maharaja and Princess Tohaan Dyah Pitaloka Citraresmi. This tragedy severely harmed the relationship between the two kingdoms and resulted in hostility for years to come, the situation never again returning to normality.

The nemesis of the Hindu Sunda Kingdom was no doubt the Islamic states of Java northern coast; they are the Demak, Cirebon and later the Banten Sultanate. In order to protect the political and spiritual order of the kingdom, also to protect the economic interest of the Sunda Kingdom against the menace of Muslim Javanese states, King Sang Ratu Jayadewata seek assistance to the Portuguese based in Malacca.

The Sunda Kingdom is known as one of the earliest polity in Southeast Asia that has established diplomatic relations with the European nation. The Luso-Sundanese padrão (1522) stone post, commemorating a treaty between the kingdoms of Portugal (based in Malacca) and Sunda. The treaty formed as pepper trade agreement as well as a political alliance against the menace of their common enemies; the Islamic Demak and Cirebon.

== Legacy ==
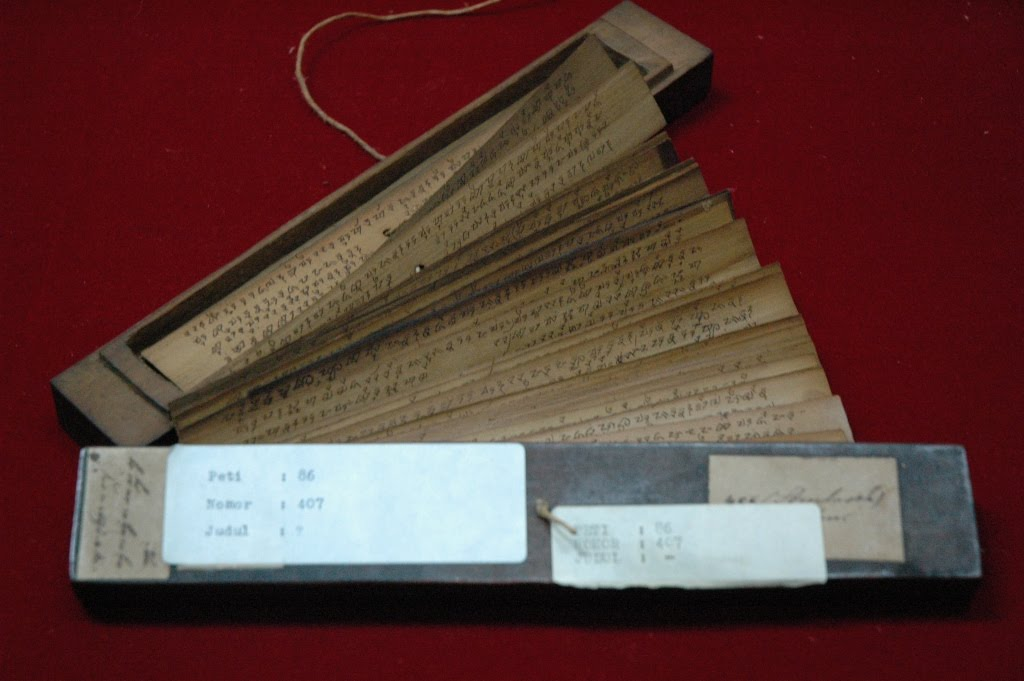
Lontar palm-leaf manuscript written in Sundanese

Although the kingdom of Sunda left little archaeological remains, it remains part of the culture of Sundanese people being kept alive through the Pantun oral tradition, the chant of poetic verses. According to tradition, the Sunda Kingdom under its legendary king, Prabu Siliwangi, is revered as the prosperous and glorious golden age for Sundanese people. The historical identity and the source of pride for Sundanese, the same as Majapahit for Javanese people. The pantun that mentioned Sunda Kingdom (popularly known as Pakuan or Pajajaran):

Talung-talung keur pajajaran. Jaman keur aya keneh kuwerabekti. Jaman guru bumi dipusti-pusti. Jaman leungit tangtu eusina metu. Euweuh anu tani kudu ngijon. Euweuh anu tani nandonkeun karang. Euweuh anu tani paeh ku jenkel. Euweuh anu tani modar ku lapar (Pantun Bogor: Kujang di Hanjuang siang, Sutaarga 1984:47)

Translation: It was better during the Pajajaran era, when Kuwera (the god of wealth) was still revered. The era when the earth guru was still honoured. The lost era when the essence of teaching is delivered. No farmer had to take loans. No farmer had to sell their lands. No farmer died in vain. No farmer died in hunger.

Dinegara Pakuan sarugih. Murah sandang sarta murah pangan. Ku sakabeh geus loba pare. Berekahna Dewa Guru anu matak kabeh sarugih. Malah ka nagri lain geus kakocap manjur. Dewa Guru miwarangan ka Ki Semar: "maneh Semar geura Indit, leumpangan ka nagri pakuan!" (Wawacan Sulanjana: Plyte 1907:88)

Translation: In the prosperous kingdom of Pakuan, people lacked no food or clothing. Rice was plenteous. The blessing of Dewa Guru laid on the land, so everyone was rich. The land's fame spread to other lands. Dewa Guru ordered Ki Semar to the kingdom of Pakuan!

Several streets in major Indonesian cities, especially in West Java, were named after Sundanese kings and the Sunda Kingdom. The street names such as Jalan Sunda in Jakarta and Bandung, Jalan Pajajaran in Bogor and Bandung, Jalan Siliwangi and Niskala Wastu Kancana in Bandung, are among street names named after Kingdom of Sunda. The Padjadjaran University in Bandung was named for Pakuan Pajajaran, the capital and the popular name for the Sunda Kingdom. The TNI Siliwangi Military Division and Siliwangi Stadium was named for King Siliwangi, the eponymous popular king of Sunda. The West Java state museum, Sri Baduga Museum in Bandung is named after king Sri Baduga Maharaja.

== List of rulers ==
Period	King's name	Ruler of	Capital	Inscription or Manuscript reference	Events
1030–1042	Prabu Detya Maharaja Sri Jayabupati	Sunda and Galuh	Pakuan	Jayabupati	Offspring of Srivijaya princess and Sunda King, son in-law of King Dharmawangsa of Mataram. Proclaimed independence from Srivijaya by assuming the title "Maharaja". Established the sacred sanctuary of Sanghyang Tapak
1175–1297	Prabu Guru Dharmasiksa	Sunda and Galuh	Saunggalah, Pakuan	Carita Parahyangan	Rakeyan Jayadharma, son of Dharmasiksa, married Dyah Lembu Tal of Singhasari, and have a son Wijaya. Jayadharma died in boyhood and Dyah lembu Tal returned to Singhasari. Wijaya later established Majapahit. Rakeyan Saunggalah, Jayadharma's brother, succeeded Dharmasiksa
1340–1350	Prabu Ragamulya Luhurprabhawa/ Aki Kolot	Sunda and Galuh	Kawali	Carita Parahyangan	
1350–1357	Prabu Maharaja Lingga Buana/ Prabu Wangi	Sunda and Galuh	Kawali	Pararaton, Carita Parahyangan, Kidung Sunda	Lingga Buana's daughter Dyah Pitaloka wed king Hayam Wuruk of Majapahit. However, in the Battle of Bubat (1357), the Sunda king, princess, and most of Sunda royal family died in Bubat, Majapahit. Gajah Mada held responsible for this Pasunda Bubat incident.
1357–1371	Mangkubumi Suradipati/ Prabu Bunisora	Sunda and Galuh	Kawali	Carita Parahyangan	Mangkubumi Suradipati temporarily ruled the kingdom on behalf of the late Prabu Wangi because the crown prince, Niskala Wastu Kancana, was still a child
1371–1475	Prabu Raja Wastu/ Niskala Wastu Kancana/ Sang Mokteng Nusalarang	Sunda and Galuh	Kawali	Kawali inscription, Carita Parahyangan	The kingdom prospered under Niskala Wastu Kancana long reign. Later, he split Sunda and Galuh between his two sons
1475–1482	Prabu Susuk Tunggal	Sunda	Pakuan	Carita Parahyangan	Twin equal kingdom of Sunda and Galuh
1475–1482	Ningrat Kancana/ Prabu Dewa Niskala	Galuh	Kawali	Carita Parahyangan	Twin equal kingdom of Sunda and Galuh
1482–1521	Sri Baduga Maharaja/ Ratu Jayadewata	Sunda and Galuh	Pakuan	Carita Parahyangan	Transferred the capital back to Pakuan. The kingdom consolidated its power and enjoyed stability, prosperity, and great wealth. His reign popularly celebrated as the "golden age" of Pajajaran
1521–1535	Prabu Surawisesa Jayaperkosa/ Ratu Sang Hiang	Sunda and Galuh	Pakuan	Batutulis, Carita Parahyangan, Luso Sundanese Treaty, Padrão	Sought the assistance of Portuguese in Malacca in 1522 against the pressure of Sultanate of Demak. The treaty failed, and the Sunda Kingdom lost Sunda Kelapa to Fatahillah Demak forces. Batu Tulis inscription was established in 1533 to commemorate his great predecessor, Sri Baduga Maharaja
1535–1543	Ratu Dewata/ Sang Ratu Jaya Dewata	Sunda and Galuh	Pakuan	Carita Parahyangan	The kingdom declined fast and lost most of its territory to Cirebon and Banten
1543–1551	Ratu Sakti	Sunda and Galuh	Pakuan	Carita Parahyangan	The kingdom grow weaker under the pressure of Sultanate of Banten
1551–1567	Nilakendra/ Tohaan di Majaya	Sunda	Pakuan, Pulasari	Carita Parahyangan	The fall of Pakuan under Sultanate of Banten invasion
1567–1579	Raja Mulya/ Prabu Surya Kencana	Sunda	Pulasari	Carita Parahyangan	The king resided in Pulasari, Pandeglang, or in Kaduhejo, Menes Subdistrict. The kingdom finally collapsed in 1576 under pressure from the Banten

== Sunda Kingdom in popular culture ==
Celebrated as 'the golden era' of ancient Indonesia, especially for Sundanese people, the Sunda kingdom has inspired many writers and artists to create works based on this era. The impact of the Sunda kingdom theme on popular culture can be seen in the following:

- Saur Sepuh (1987–1991), a radio drama and film by Niki Kosasih. Begun as a popular radio drama program in the late 1980s, Saur Sepuh is set in 15th century Java and is about Brama Kumbara, a fictional king of Madangkara, itself a fictional kingdom neighbour of the Pajajaran. Several films and TV series are also based on the Saur Sepuh story.
- Prabu Siliwangi (1988), a film directed by Sofyan Sharna, about the fictionalised life story of King Siliwangi.
- Prabu Siliwangi (2009), a novel written by E Rokajat Asura, also about King Siliwangi.
- Dyah Pitaloka (2007), a novel by Hermawan Aksan, about Sundanese Princess Dyah Pitaloka Citraresmi, focussed around the Bubat War. The novel virtually took the same context and was inspired by Kidung Sundayana.
- Rise of the Rajas (2016) expansion pack from Age of Empires II computer game, the Pasunda Bubat tragedy was featured as one of Gajah Mada's military campaign.

== See also ==
- Hinduism in Java
- History of Indonesia
- Pura Parahyangan Agung Jagatkarta
- Sundanese people
- List of monarchs of Java
