= Sumedang Larang Kingdom =

Former Islamic kingdom in Indonesia

- 1529–1620
- Capital: Kutamaya (now Sumedang)
- Common languages: Sundanese
- Religion: Islam
- Government: Monarchy
- Prabu
- History
  - Sumedang Larang became an independent state preceded the fall of Sunda Kingdom: 1529
  - Sumedang Larang joined the Mataram Sultanate: 1620
- Currency: Native gold and silver coins
Preceded by	Succeeded by
Sunda Kingdom	Mataram Sultanate

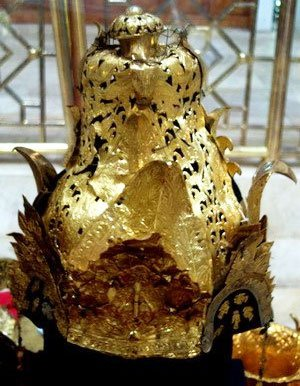
Makuta Binokasih Sanghyang Paké, the royal crown of Sunda kingdom. After the fall of Pajajaran to Banten, the crown was evacuated to Sumedang Larang and become their regalia.

Sumedang Larang (Pegon: كراجأن سومدڠ لارڠ) was an Islamic Kingdom based in Sumedang, West Java. Its territory consisted of the Parahyangan region, before becoming a vassal state under the Mataram Sultanate.

== History ==
This kingdom was founded in 721 AD by Prabu Tajimalela, descendant of the king Wretikandayun of Galuh Kingdom, in the former territory of Tembong Agung Kingdom. This kingdom was also known as the Kingdom of Himbar Buana before changing its name to Sumedang Larang. Sumedang Larang status as part of the Sunda Kingdom and Galuh between the 8th century to the 16th century AD, where the ruler is under the ruler of the two kingdoms. The capital city of Sumedang Larang at the time of its establishment was in Citebong Girang, which is currently included in the Cikeusi, Darmaraja, Sumedang.

Islam began to develop in this region during the reign of Prince Santri (1530–1578 AD). During his reign, Sumedang Larang joined the Cirebon Sultanate. In 1578 AD, his son named Prince Angkawijaya received the inheritance Pajajaran and was crowned King of Sumedang Larang with the title Prabu Geusan Ulun, where this heirloom signifies Sumedang Larang as the legitimate successor of the Sunda Kingdom breed. According to Babad Sumedang, the Sumedang Larang area is bounded by Java Sea in the north, Cipamugas River in the west, Indian Ocean in the south, and Cipamali in the east. The Sunda kingdom itself collapsed in 1579 AD after Pulasari in Pandeglang was conquered by Maulana Yusuf of Banten (Burak Pajajaran).

The collapse of the Sunda Kingdom made the former territory divided between the Banten Sultanate in the west and the Cirebon Sultanate in the east. Due to the occurrence of The Harisbaya incident, Sumedang Larang under King Geusan Ulun in 1585 declared itself a sovereign state and separated from Cirebon. The independence of Sumedang Larang did not last long, only around 35 years. Due to the situation at that time which was relatively weak and squeezed between the three great powers (Banten, Cirebon, and Demak). Prabu Aria Suriadiwangsa in 1620 AD decided to join Mataram, where the status of Sumedang Larang was reduced from a kingdom to a regency under Mataram.

== See also ==
- History of Indonesia
- Sundanese people
- List of monarchs of Java
