= Sanghyang Siksa Kandang Karesian =

Sanghyang Siksa Kandang Karesian is an Old Sundanese didactic text, providing the reader with religious and moralistic rules, prescriptions and lessons. The title means something like “the book of rules with guidance to be a resi (wise or holy man)”. This text is preserved in the National Library of Indonesia and identified as kropak 630; it consist of 30 gebang leaves (formerly identified as nipah) and in the lontar manuscript L624.

The gebang manuscript is dated in a chronogram nora catur sagara wulan (0-4-4-1), that is Saka 1440 or 1518 AD. It had already been referred to in earlier publications by Holle and Noorduyn. A complete edition with translation, introduction, commentary and glossary was presented in a stenciled work by Atja and Danasasmita (1981a). It has been republished in book-form in Danasasmita et al. (1987:73-118). Text edition of the lontar manuscript has been done by Nurwansah, published in journal of Sundalana (2013). The text is from Galuh (a capital city of the Sunda Kingdom).

== See also ==
- Sunda Wiwitan
- Hinduism in Java
