= Horren inscription =

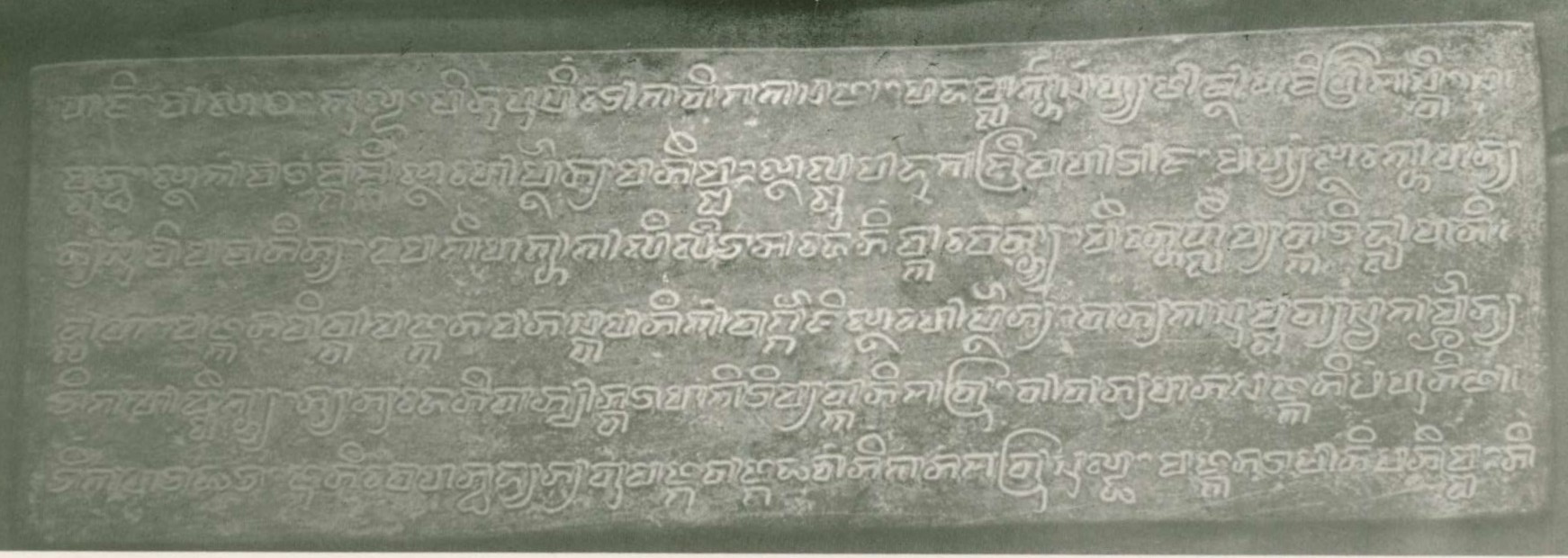
Horren inscription estimated circa 11th century

Horren inscription is a copperplate inscription measuring 32.6 cm length, 10.6 cm width, discovered in Southern Kediri, in Campur Darat village, Tulungagung, East Java. Initially this inscription was thought to originated from Majapahit period. The examining of the style and linguistic structure this inscription appears to be closer to King Airlangga period of Kahuripan (11th century).

Currently this inscription is stored in Sonobudoyo Museum, Yogyakarta.

== Content ==
=== Transcription ===
IIa.

1. haji. mānațha. kuņda. pinupu pingro katiga kasaha. padamlaknang sang hyang ājñā haji prāçastī, sa
2. mbandha. ikang waramgajgi i horrěn maněmbah i Ibu paduka çrī mahārāja. manghyang i knohan ya
3. n sumima thānīnya. umagěhakna kālīliranā dening wkāwetnya. měnne hlěm tka ri dlāha ni
4. dlāha. mangkana mittā mangkana manastapa nikang warggaji i horrěn. tan kasumbat swakarmmanya
5. ri kahāmběknya. nyan deni tanpāntara hakirim tka ni çatru. tātan hana sangka ni panghuninga
6. ring kaharadara. nguniweh an dadyan tumangga-tangga datang nikanang çatru sunda. mangkana rasā ning paněmbah ni

IIb.

1. kanang warggāji i horrěn. i Ibu ni pāduka çrī mahārāja, kunang sangkāri mahasara nikāhotsa
2. hā nikanang warggaji i horrěn. makanimittă pinakahujung karang paminggir. catu ni matingkah bāba
3. han nitya lot kahudanan kapyeyan. makadadah çari ni paprīhakěn Ibu ni paduka çri mahā
4. rāja. ri samarakaryya sarisari tumāmaha sadatang ni salmah wukir nikanang çatru. i katakottama
5. ni pamrih nikanang warggaji i horrěn. ika mangkāna ya tika nuwuhakěn murby arěna sama i çri ma
6. hārāja. hetu ni turun i kārunya çri mahārāja. i manghyang nikanang warggaji i horrěn. paka

=== Translation ===
IIa.

1. haji (king), Manatha, Kunda, levied twice, third, ninth. Created royal inscription for that village.
2. The reason is the people of Horrěn village came to the king and begged him for
3. their village to be appointed as a sima (land), to be confirmed so it could be inherited for their descendants from now on until for-
4. ever. That was the cause and (this wish) that has become the grief of Horrěn village inhabitants. Not to forget also their own efforts
5. that became their mind/purpose. Not how long after (they) send (the tribute), came the enemy. Nobody knew nor suspected
6. about the destruction that came suddenly; unexpectedly came the enemy (from) Sunda. Such is the content of this petition

IIb.

1. the people of Horrěn village towards Sri Maharaja. Because of the burden and effort
2. of the people of Horrěn village which like the edge of a rock that can remove a stone that is wrongly positioned,
3. which always endured rain and heat and sacrifice themselves in order to help/freed Sri Maharaja
4. from a battle which in doubt because the enemy had entered and encountered from the land and the hill/mountain suddenly. That was the virtue
5. of the people of Horrěn village. That was the efforts that please Sri Ma
6. haraja. That is the reason for the boon from Sri Maharaja at the request of the good people of Horren village.

== See also ==
- Kahuripan
- Sunda Kingdom
