= Ciaruteun inscription =

5th-century stone inscription in West Java

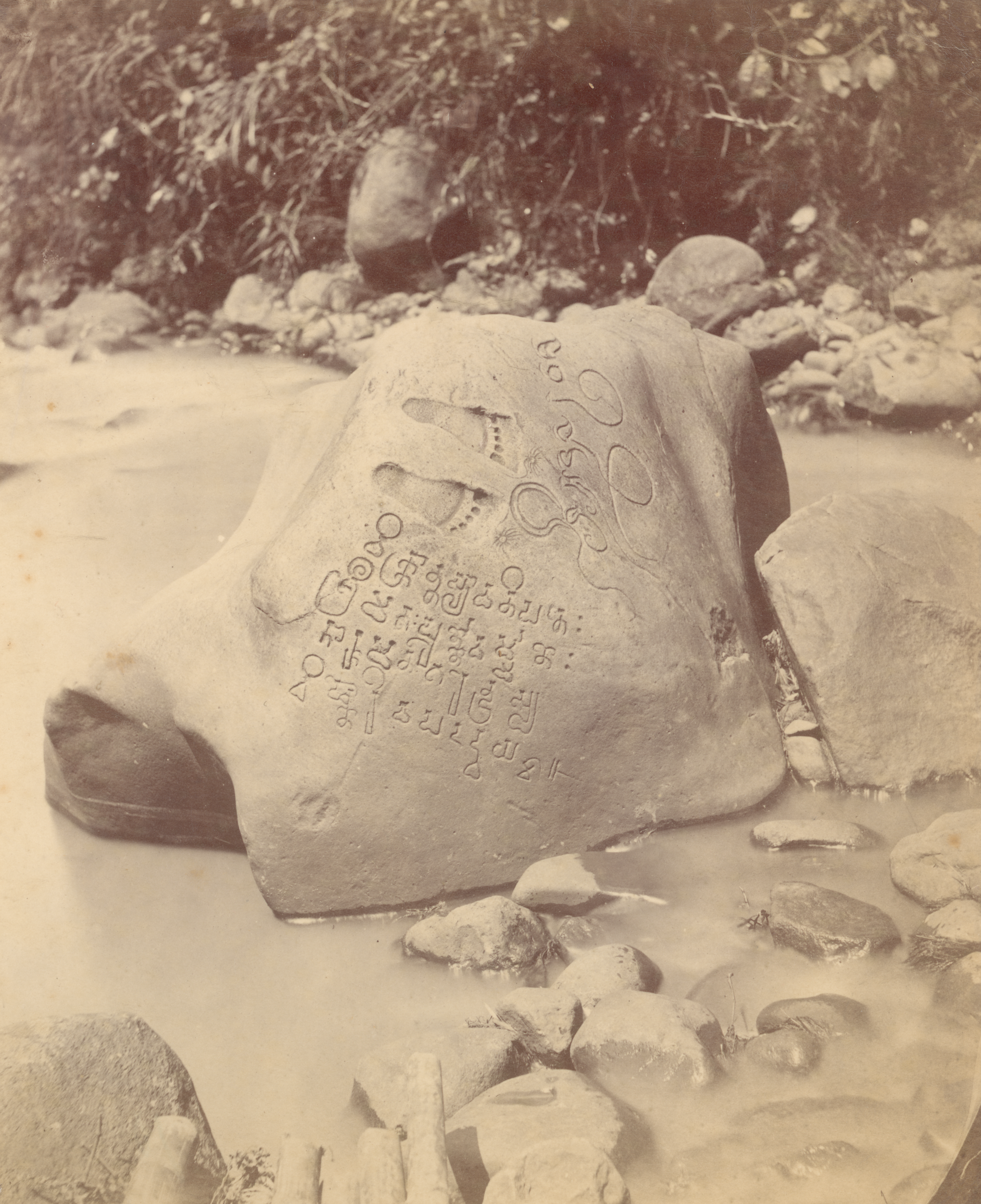
- Ciaruteun inscription on its original location, circa 1900
- Material: Stone
- Size: 2 by 1.5 meters
- Writing: Vengi Script in Sanskrit
- Created: early 5th century
- Discovered: Ciaruteun river, Ciaruteun Ilir village, Cibungbulang district, Bogor Regency, West Java, Indonesia
- Present location: in situ; 6°31′39.84″S 106°41′28.32″E

Ciaruteun inscription (Indonesian: Prasasti Ciaruteun) also written Ciarutön or also known as Ciampea inscription is a 5th-century stone inscription discovered on the riverbed of Ciaruteun River, a tributary of Cisadane River, not far from Bogor, West Java, Indonesia. The inscription is dated from the Tarumanagara kingdom period, one of the earliest Hindu kingdoms in Indonesian history. The inscription states King Purnawarman is the ruler of Tarumanagara.

== Location and description ==
Ciaruteun inscription is located in Ciaruteun Ilir village, Cibungbulang district, Bogor Regency; on coordinate 6°31’23.6” latitude and 106°41’28.2” longitude. This location is approximately 19 kilometres Northwest of Bogor city center. The location is a small hill (Sunda: pasir) which is the confluence of three rivers: Cisadane, Cianten, and Ciaruteun. Until 19th century, the location is reported as part of Pasir Muara, which included into the private land of Tjampéa (Ciampea), although today it is part of Cibungbulang district.

The inscription was inscribed on a huge natural stone locally known as batu kali (river stone) weighted eight tonnes, and measures 200 centimetres by 150 centimetres.

== History ==
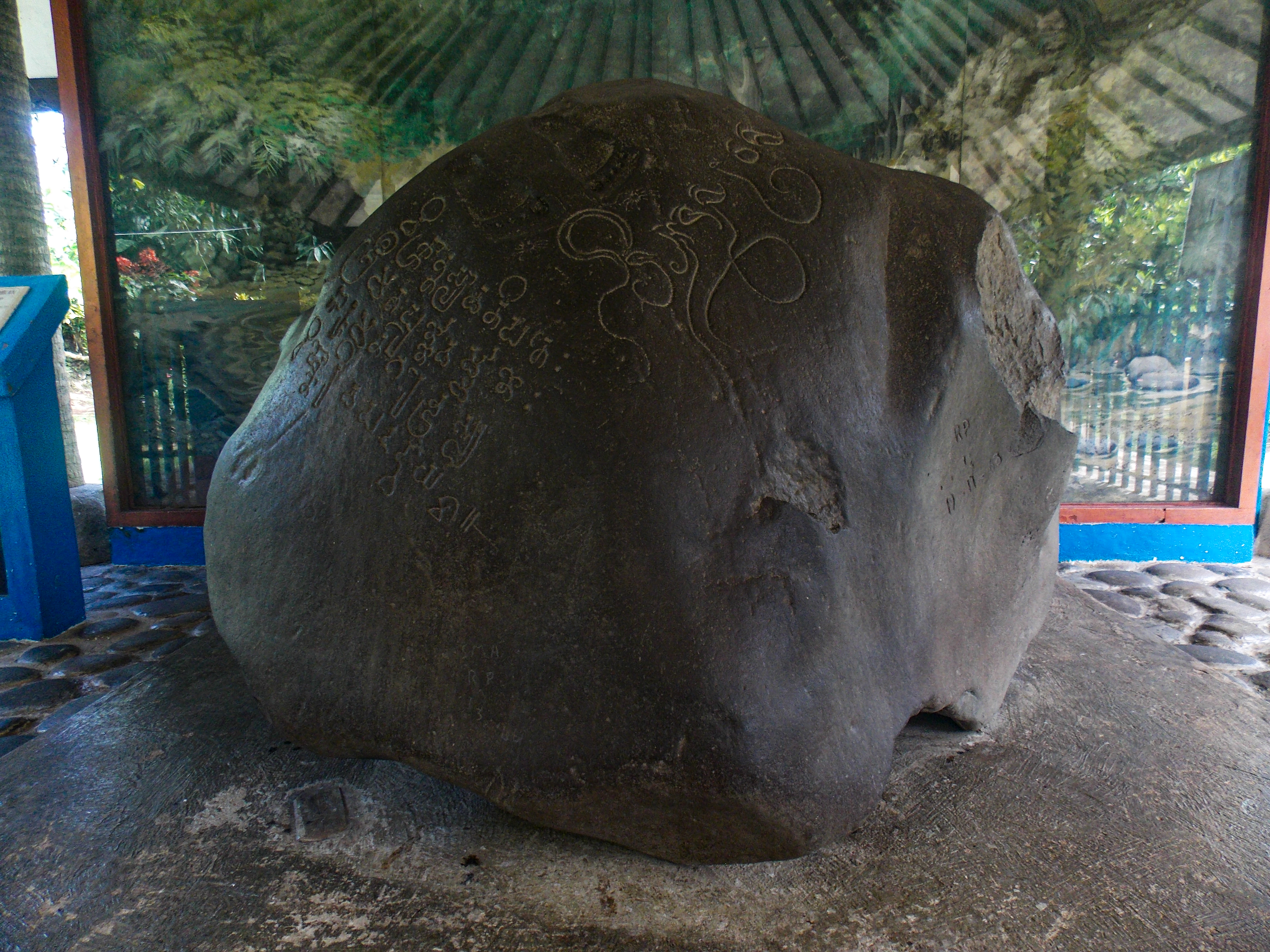
Ciaruteun Inscription.

In 1863 Dutch East Indies, a huge boulder of inscribed stone was spotted near Tjampea (Ciampea) not far from Buitenzorg (Bogor). The stone inscription was discovered on the river bed of Tjiaroeteun river, a tributary of Cisadane River. It is today known as Ciaruteun inscription, dated from the 5th century, written in Vengi script and in Sanskrit language. This is the earliest inscription that clearly mentioned the kingdom's name — "Tarumanagara". The inscription reports Purnawarman as the most famous king of Tarumanagara. In the same year, the discovery of this inscription was reported to the Bataaviasch Genootschap van Kunsten en Wetenschappen (today National Museum of Indonesia) in Batavia. Because of the large flood in 1893, the stone was carried away several meters and was slightly tilted. Then in 1903, the inscription was restored to its original position.

In 1981, the Directorate of Protection and Development of Heritage and Antiquities, a subdivision of Ministry of Education and Culture, moved the stone inscription from the river bed into a higher location, not far from its original position. Today, the inscription is protected by a pendopo roofed structure in order to protect the inscription from weathering and vandalism. The replicas of the inscription are displayed in three museums; National Museum of Indonesia and Jakarta History Museum in Jakarta, and also Sri Baduga Museum in Bandung.

== Content ==
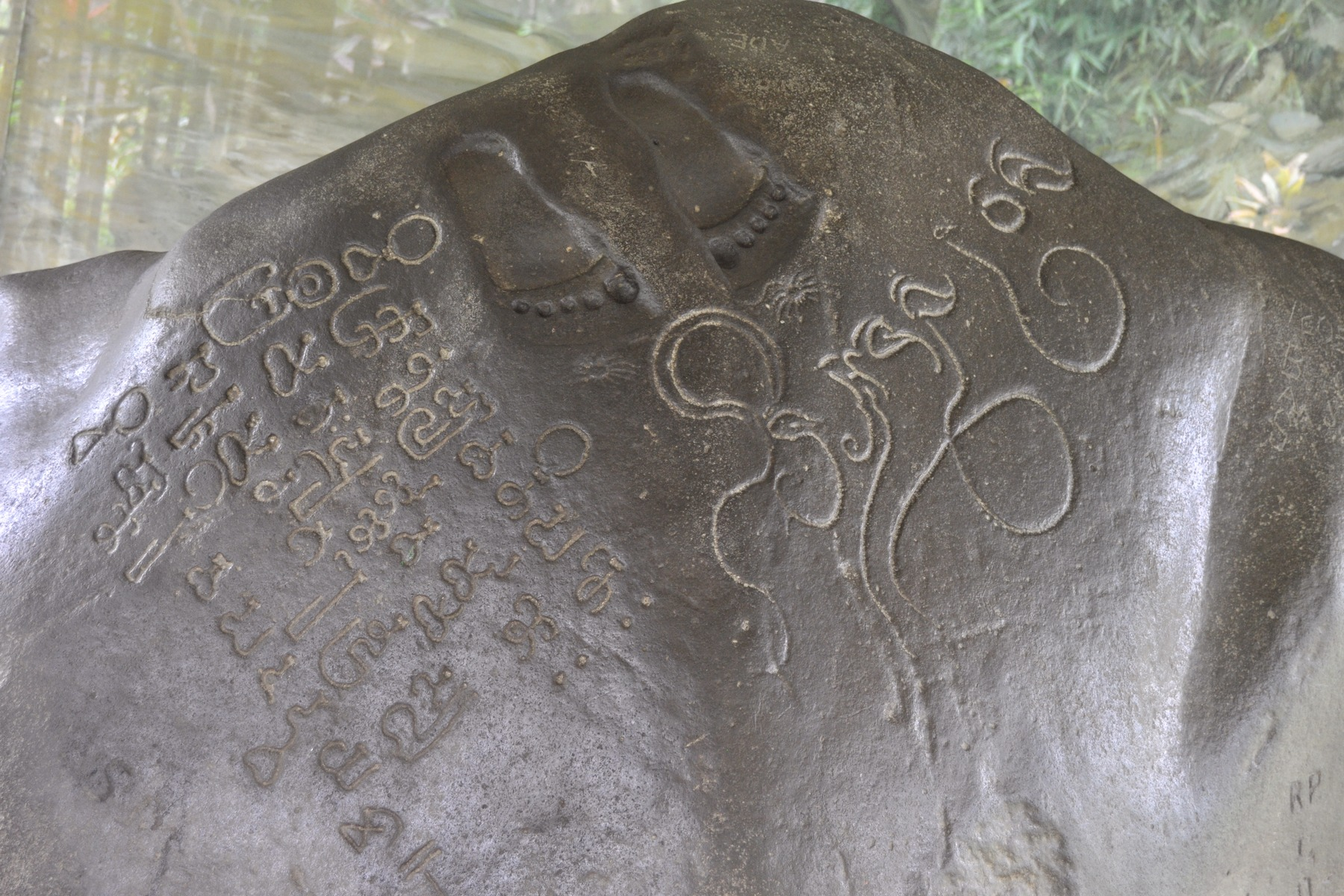
The ancient letters inscribed on the Ciaruteun inscription, located in its current location at Ciaruteun Ilir village.

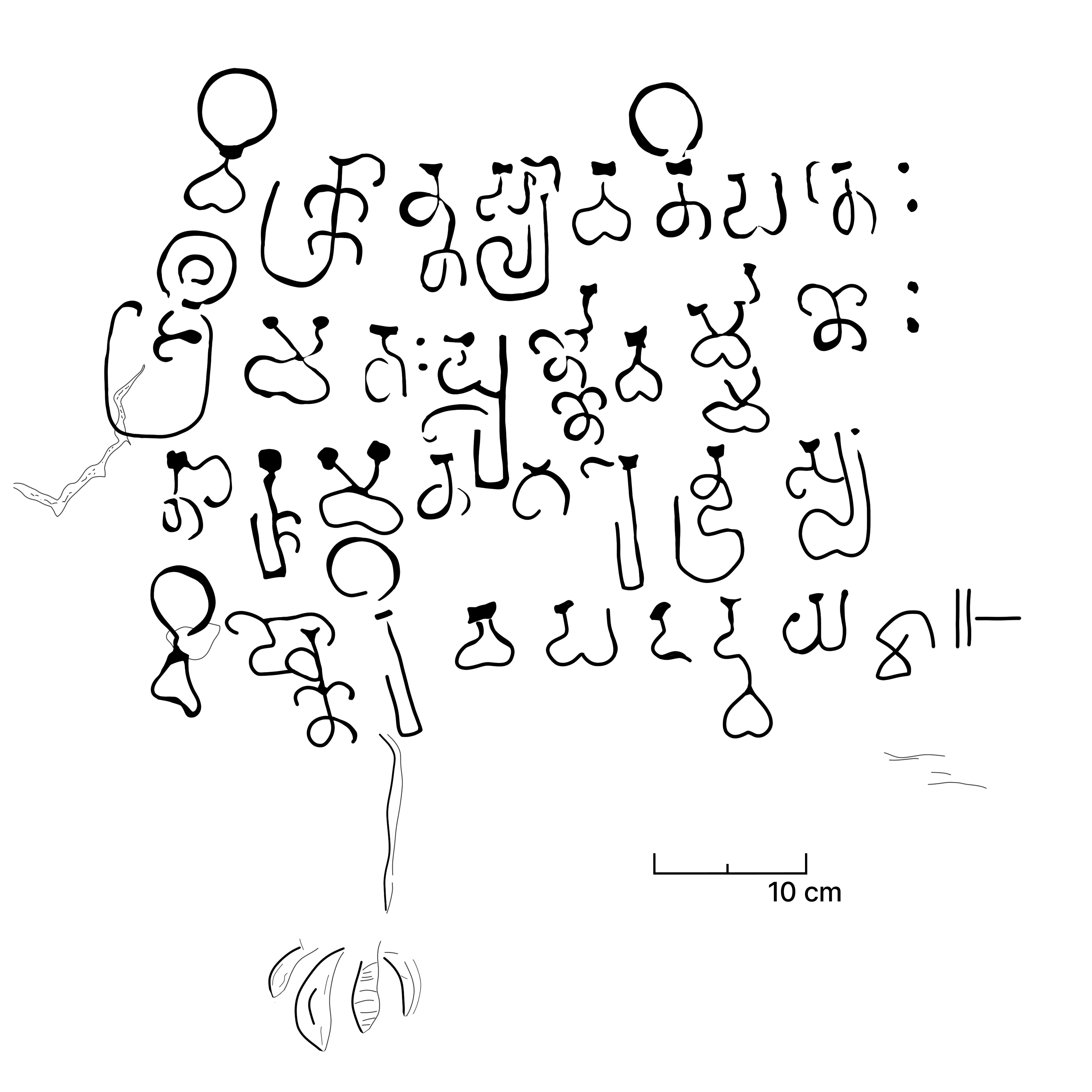
The text of Ciaruteun Inscription.

Ciaruteun inscription was written in Vengi script composed as a sloka poem in Sanskrit with Anustubh metrum consists of four lines. On the end of the inscribed text, there is a print of a pair of foot soles and shell characters (Sankha lipi).

=== Transcription ===
Line	Transliteration
1	vikkrāntasyāvanipateḥ
2	śrīmataḥ pūrṇṇavarmmaṇaḥ
3	tārūmanagarendrasya
4	viṣṇoriva padadvayam

=== Translation ===
Of the powerful illustrious and brave King

Of the glorious Purnawarman

Of the lord of Tarumanagara

Whose foot soles are like those of Vishnu.

The print of foot soles symbolize the king's authority on the land where the inscription is located. The comparison to the Hindu god Vishnu symbolizes that Vishnu was the chief deity revered by Purnawarman, and comparing Purnawarman authority with Vishnu as the ruler as well as the protector of the people. The utilization of footprints at that times was most probably as a sign of authenticity, like a seal or a personal signature of today, or like a sign of land ownership.

== See also ==
- Tugu inscription
- Tarumanagara
- Sunda Kingdom
