= Kebon Kopi II inscription =

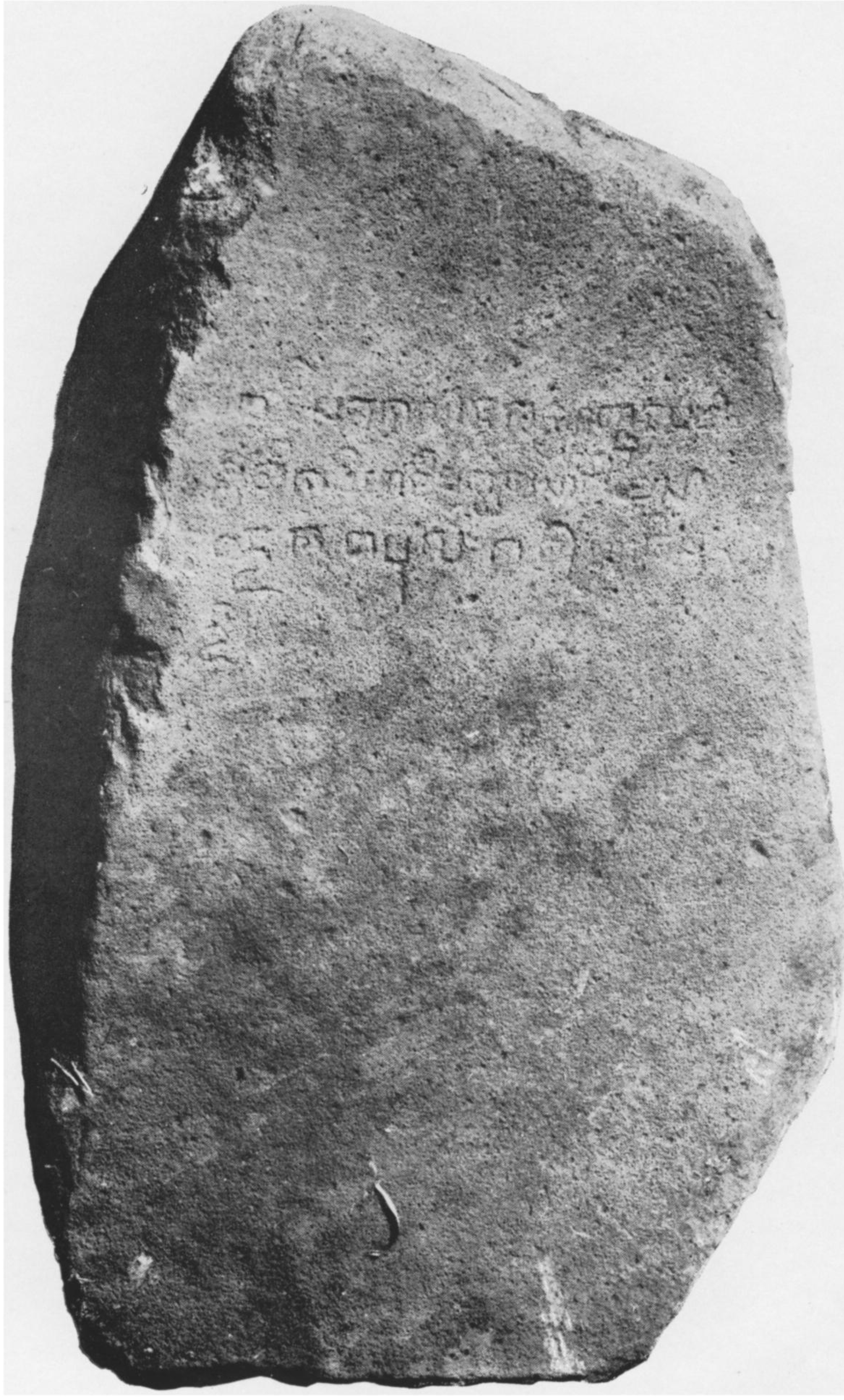
The Rarkyan Juru Pangambat inscription in Bogor, West Java.

Kebonkopi II inscription or Pasir Muara inscription or Rakryan Juru Pangambat inscription is the oldest inscription that mentioned the toponymy Sunda dated from 854 Saka (932 CE), discovered in Kebon Kopi village, Bogor, near Kebon Kopi I inscription, and named as such to differ it from this older inscription dated from Tarumanagara era.

Archaeologist F. D. K. Bosch, that had studied the inscription, wrote that this inscription was written in Old Malay, stated that a "King of Sunda has been reinstalled on the throne" and interpreting this event took place in the year 932 CE. Unfortunately this inscription was lost, stolen during the tumult of early World War II around the 1940s.

== Location ==
Kebonkopi II inscription was discovered in Pasir Muara hamlet, Ciaruteun Ilir village, Cibungbulang, Bogor Regency, West Java, in the 19th century during the forest clearing to make way for a new coffee plantation. This inscription is located approximately 1 kilometre from the Kebon Kopi I inscription (Tapak Gajah inscription).

== Content ==
Transcription:

Ini sabdakalanda Rakryan Juru Pangambat I kawihaji panyaca pasagi marsandeca ~ ba(r) pulihkan hajiri Sunda

Translation:

This memorial stone is (to remark) the saying of Rakryan Juru Pangambat (Royal Hunter), in the year 458 Saka (read 854 Saka or 932 CE), that the authority (order) is returned to the king of Sunda.

== Interpretation ==
The inscription chandrasengkala (chronogram) written 458 Saka, however some historians suggested that the year of the inscription must be read backward as 854 Saka (932 CE) because the Sunda kingdom could not have existed in 536 CE, in the era of the Kingdom of Tarumanagara (358–669 CE).

This inscription was written in Kawi alphabet, however curiously the language being used is Old Malay. Bosch proposed that the use of Old Malay suggests Srivijayan influence on Western Java. He also draw comparison between the period of 932 CE of this inscription with the year 929 which coincide with the shift of political center of Mataram kingdom from Central to East Java.

French historian, Claude Guillot from École française d'Extrême-Orient proposed that the Kebonkopi II inscription was a declaration of independent (possibly from Srivijaya) of the newly established Kingdom of Sunda. Australian historian M. C. Ricklefs also supported this suggestion in his book A History of Modern Indonesia since c. 1200.

The name of Sunda was first mentioned in this inscription. However, this inscription stated “berpulihkan hajiri Sunda”, can be interpreted that previously there had been a king of Sunda before, and his office (authority) was finally restored. While the name "Pangambat" means "hunter", thus can be interpreted that the King was a skillful hunter.

Other inscription that mentioned the toponymy Sunda was Sanghyang Tapak inscription I and II (952 Saka or 1030 CE), and Horren inscription (Southern Kediri) dated from Airlangga reign in East Java .

== See also ==
- Sunda Kingdom

== Sources ==
- Guillot, Claude, Lukman Nurhakim, Sonny Wibisono, "La principauté de Banten Girang", Archipel Volume 50, 1995, halaman 13–24
- Ricklefs, M. C., A History of Modern Indonesia since c. 1200, Palgrave MacMillan, New York, 2008 (terbitan ke-4), ISBN 978-0-230-54686-8
