= Cidanghiang inscription =

Inscription from the Tarumanagara kingdom

Cidanghiang inscription, also called Lebak inscription, is an inscription from the Tarumanagara kingdom, estimated to be from the 4th century CE. The inscription was found in 1947 on the bank of Cidanghiang River in Lebak village, Munjul district, in Pandeglang Regency, Banten, Indonesia. The inscription is written in the Pallava script and composed in the Sanskrit language.

== Text ==
This inscription mentions a king named Purnawarman, who used the title vikrānta, which indicates that he was a worshiper of Lord Vishnu. It consists only of two lines, transliterated as follows:

vikranta ‘yam vanipateh prabhuh satyaparā(k)ra(mah)
narendrasya bhūtena śrīmatah pūrnnavarmmanah

== Translation ==
The translation of this inscription according to philologist Poerbatjaraka (1952) is as follows:

This is the conqueror of the three worlds (with his three steps),
his majesty King Pūrnavarman, the great king, the hero (and) to be the banner of all kings in the worlds

== See also ==
- Purnawarman
- Tarumanagara
