= Cianten River =

River in West Java, Indonesia

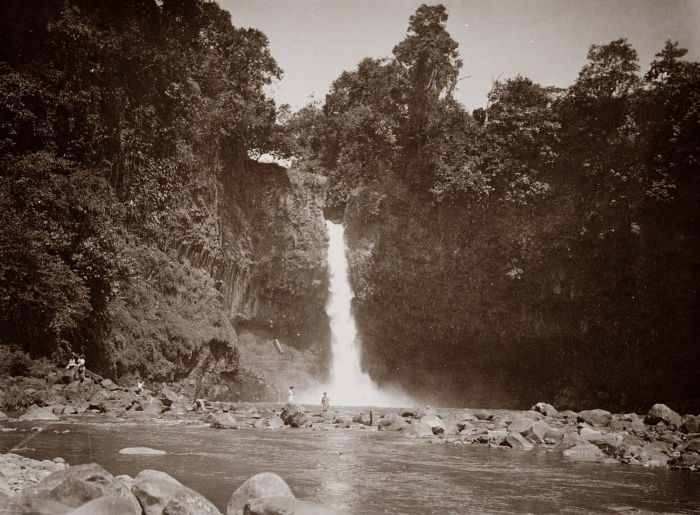
- The Curug Lontar waterfall on the Cianten River

Physical characteristics
- Source: Mount Halimun Salak National Park
- Mouth: Cisadane
  - coordinates: 6°31′22″S 106°41′27″E
- Length: 49.2 km
- Basin size: 426.5 km^{2}

The Cianten is a river that flows in the western part of Bogor Regency, West Java and is a tributary of the Cisadane River.

== Course ==
The river originates from the Mount Halimun Salak National Park, flowing northwards. It flows for 49.2 km, meeting the Cisadane River still in Bogor Regency. It is Cisadane's longest tributary, with a watershed of 426.5 square kilometers.

== History ==
An inscription, dated from 536 AD from the times of the Tarumanagara Kingdom, had been discovered at Cianten's confluence with Cisadane.

A hydropower plant, the Kracak power station, was erected on Cianten in 1926 and is still operational to this day, producing 18.9 MW of electricity. In 1942, during the Dutch East Indies campaign, the Battle of Leuwiliang occurred between Australian and Japanese forces on the banks of the Cianten River.

== Use ==
Aside from hydropower and irrigation purposes, the Cianten is a popular rafting destination. The rafting route generally ends at the Cisadane confluence.

== See also ==
- List of drainage basins of Indonesia
