= Buni culture =

Prehistoric culture in Java, Indonesia

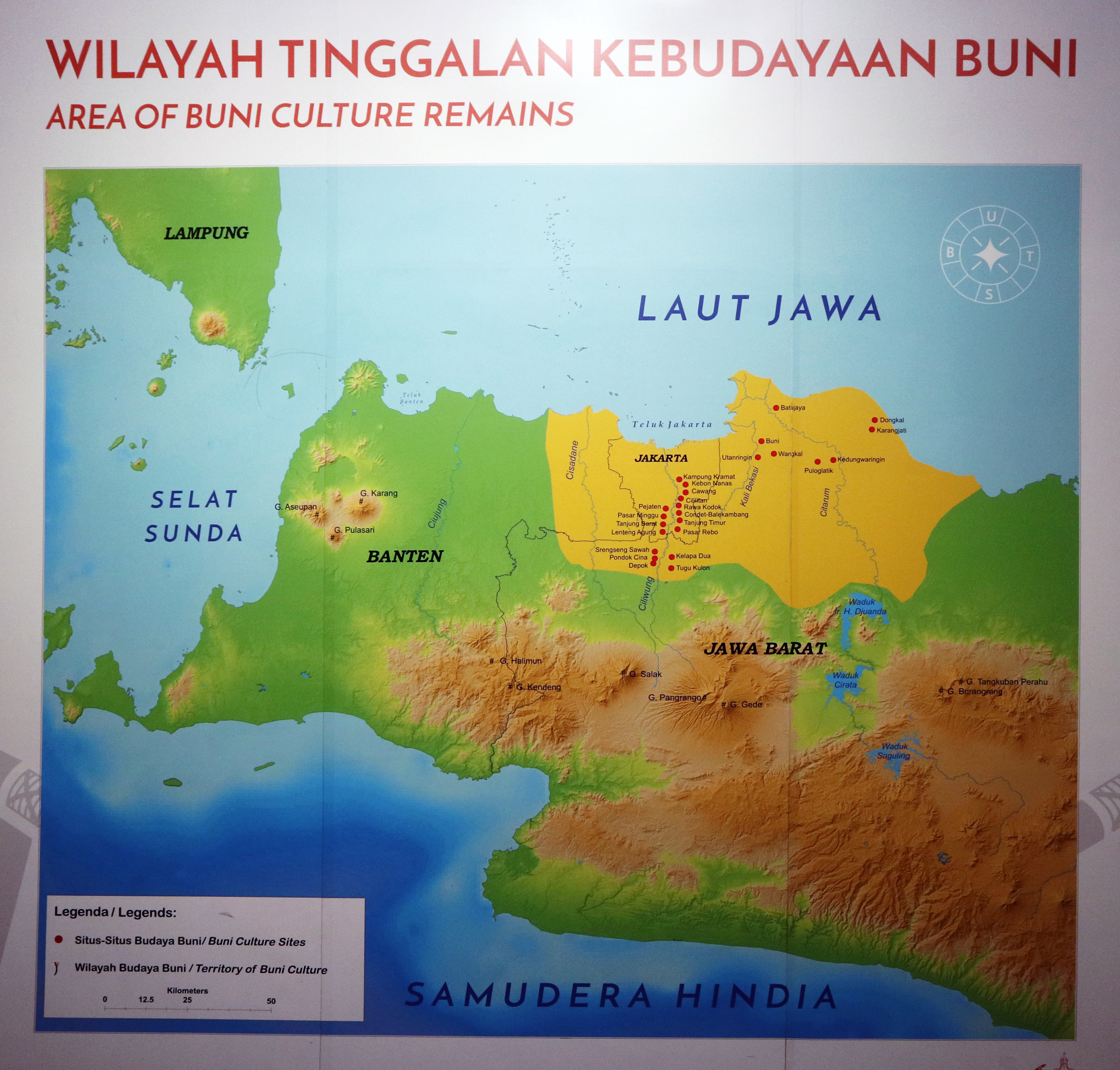
- Areas of Buni culture
- Geographical range: Jakarta, West Java
- Dates: c. 400 BC–100 AD

The Buni culture is a prehistoric clay pottery culture that flourished in coastal northern West Java, Jakarta and Banten around 400 BC to 100 AD and probably survived until 500 AD. The culture was named after its first discovered archaeological site, Buni village in Babelan, Bekasi, east of Jakarta.

The Buni culture is known for its peculiar pottery with incised, geometrical decorations, and the fact that it yielded the first Indian rouletted wares recorded from Southeast Asia. Clay potteries were later developed with evidence found in Anyer to Cirebon. Artifacts such as food and drink containers, dated from 400 BC to AD 100 have been found, mostly as burial gifts.

== Characteristics ==
Some experts describe the Buni culture as proto-Batawi. It is also suggested that the culture itself began as a prehistoric community but developed into another culture as it assimilated Hinduism during the fourth and fifth centuries A.D. These two cultures, which are separated by 100 to 200 years, are depicted in the temple complex built at Batujaya and the Hindu temple complex system constructed later. These two cultures may not be viewed individually due to communal continuity.

The Buni clay pottery culture bears similarities with the Sa Huỳnh styles in Vietnam and the regions around the South China Sea as well as the style of the earthenware excavated at Plawangan in north-central Java. Pottery artefacts were discovered such as clay dishes, pots, water jars, and other daily utensils.

Megalithic remains can also be found, such as beads as burial gifts, and also menhirs and stone tables. The people that supported the Buni culture had established trade with foreign people. This is shown by the existence of the Indian rouletted ware discovered at Kobak Kendal and Cibutak, which date back to the first and second century A.D. The kingdom of Tarumanagara is probably the successor of the Buni culture after the adoption of Hinduism. The remnants of Buni pottery have also been discovered at the Batujaya Archaeological Site and the Kendaljaya site in Karawang.

== Artifacts ==
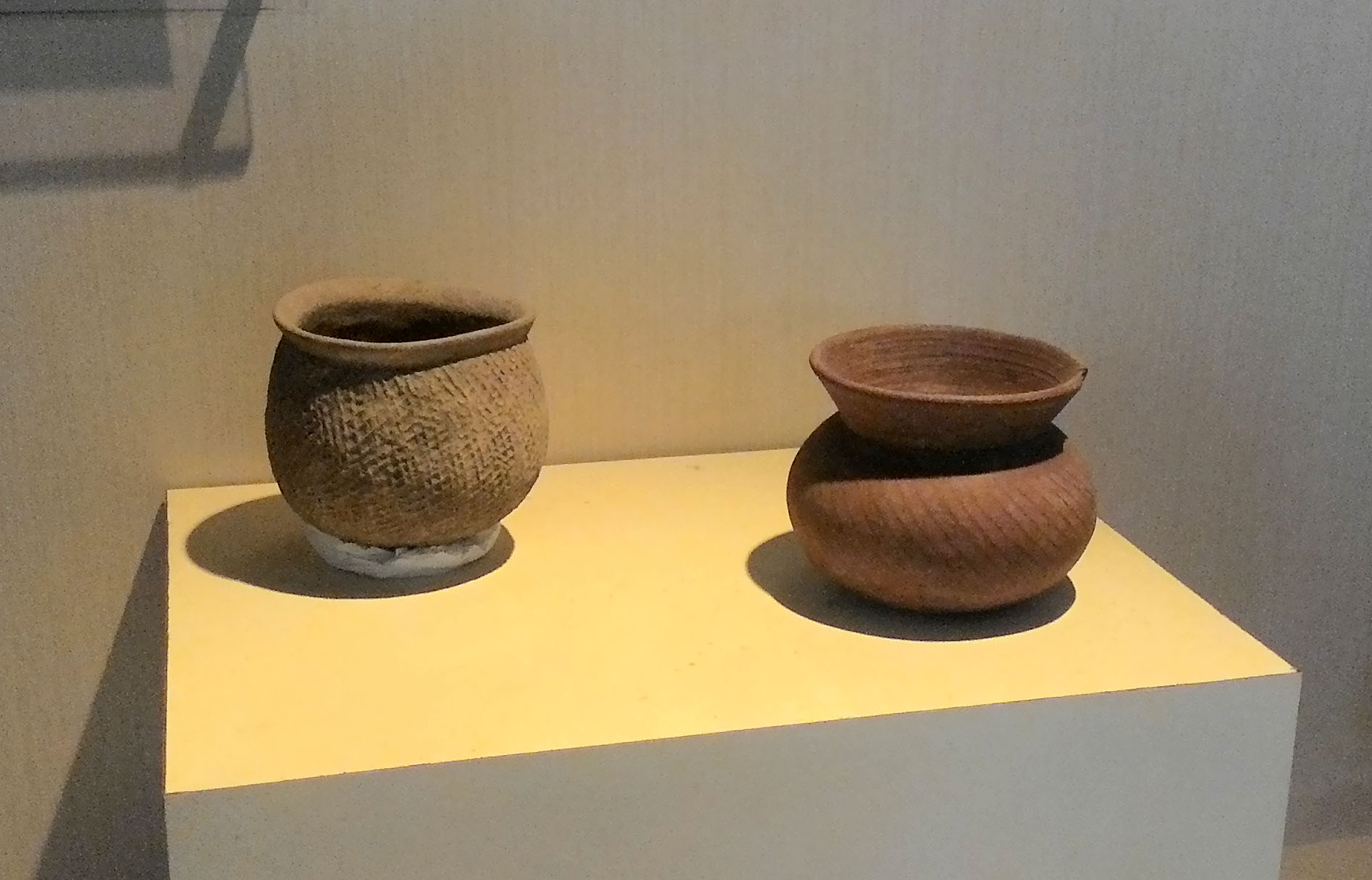
lncised pot containers

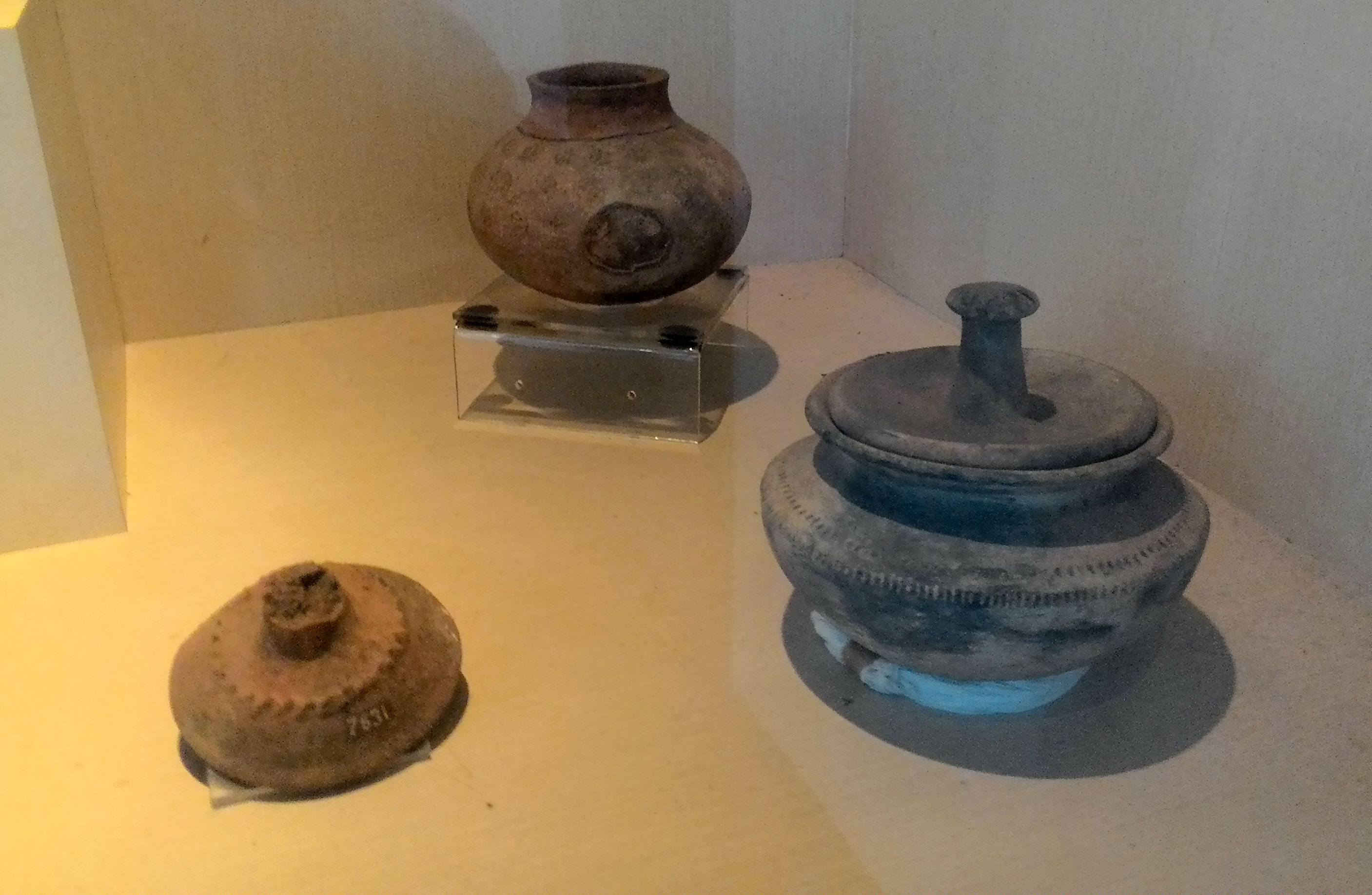
Containers with lids

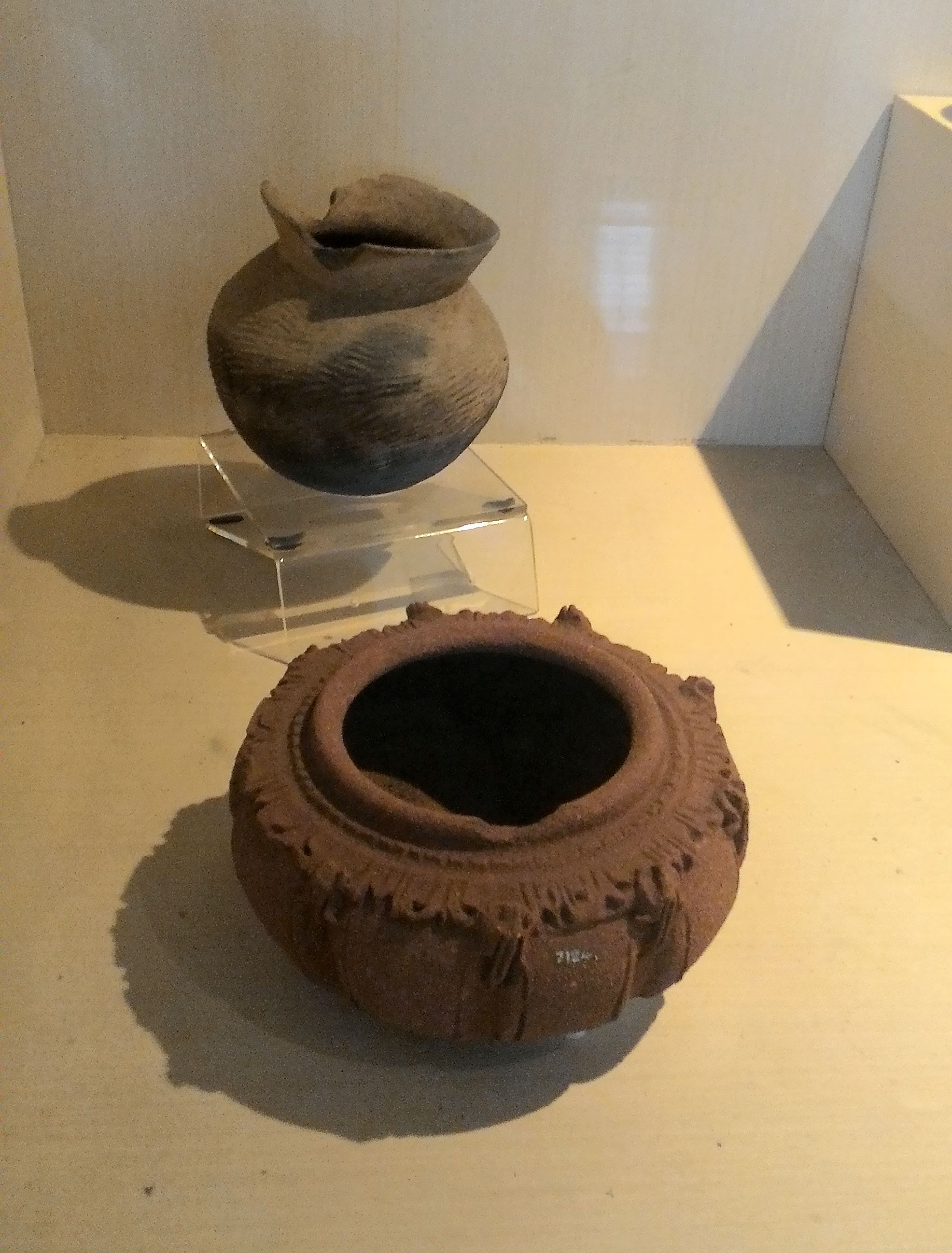
Jars
