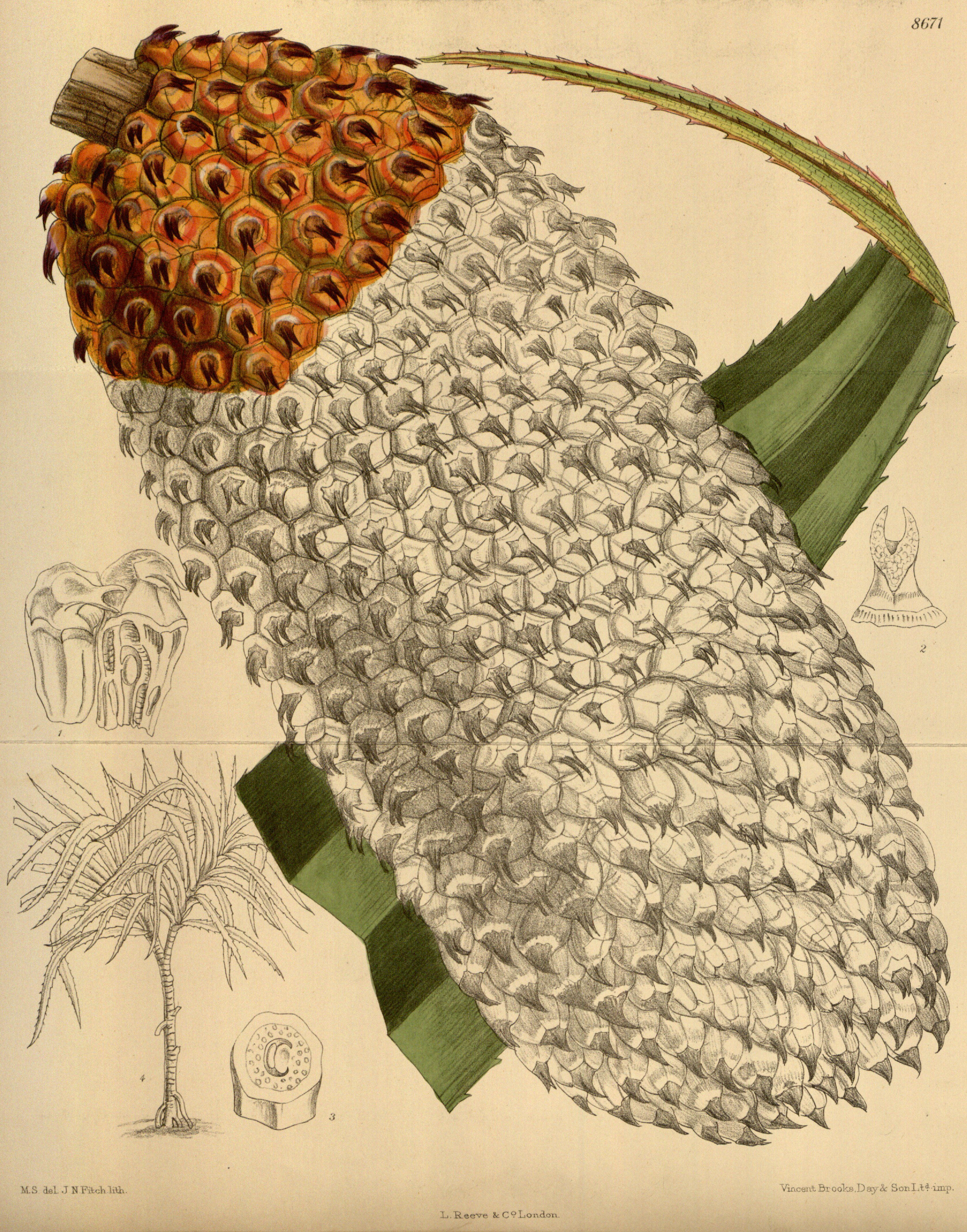
- From Curtis's Botanical Magazine

Scientific classification
- Kingdom: Plantae
- Clade: Tracheophytes
- Clade: Angiosperms
- Clade: Monocots
- Order: Pandanales
- Family: Pandanaceae
- Genus: Pandanus
- Species: P. furcatus

Binomial name
- Pandanus furcatus Roxb.

= Pandanus furcatus =

Species of flowering plant

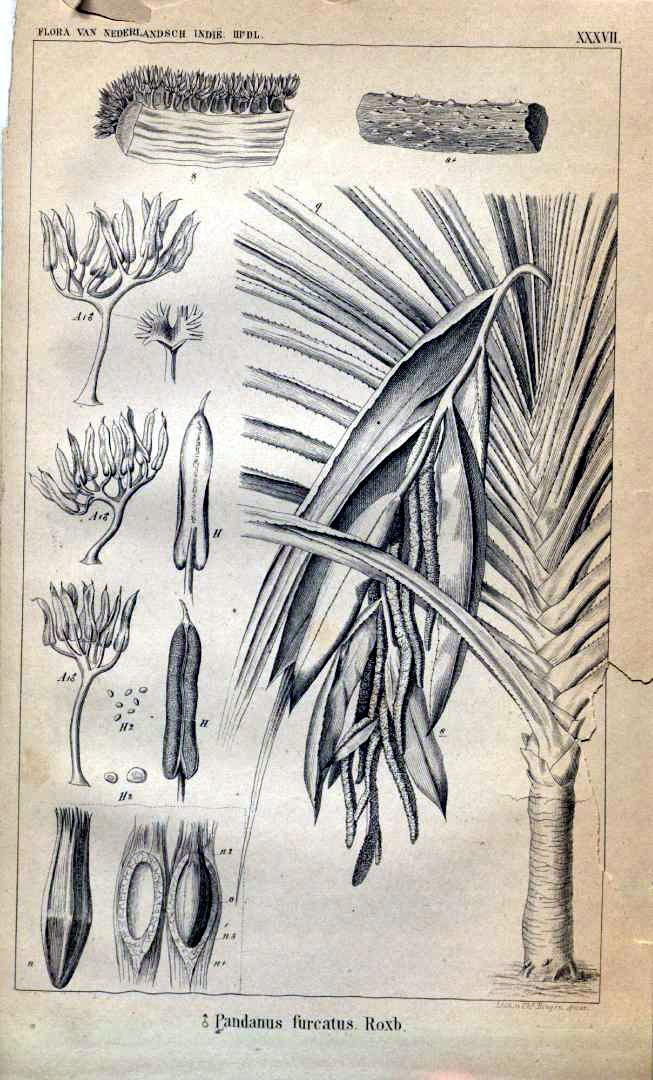

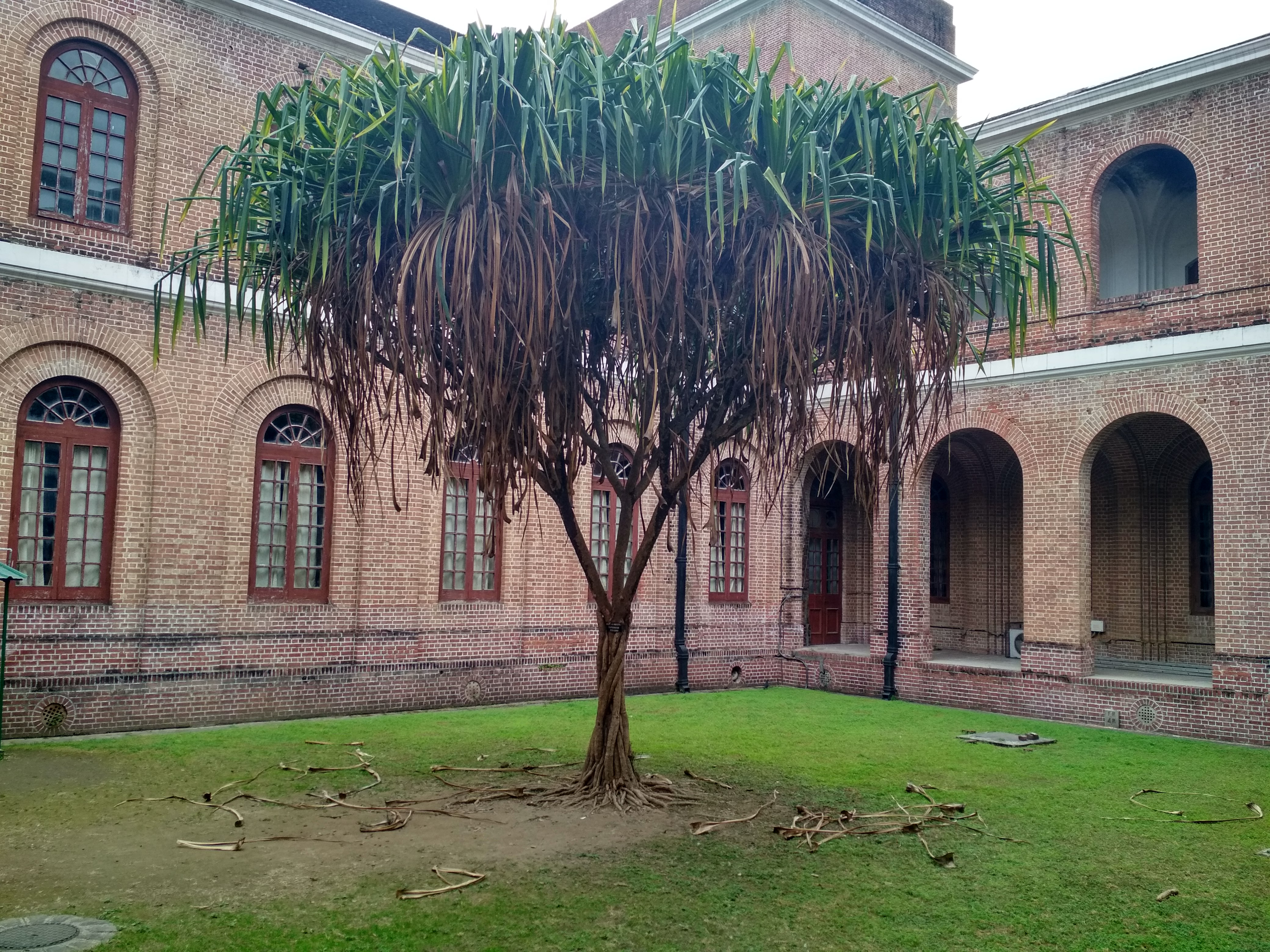
A Pandanus furcatus plant from Dehradun, India

Pandanus furcatus (common name Pandan Atono) Roxb., also known as korr, pandan or Himalayan/Nepal screw pine (named for the screw-like arrangement of its leaves), is native to the Sikkim Himalaya of Northeast India, Bhutan and Nepal, Malaysia, Indonesia and West Africa, and occurs on moist and shady slopes of ravines between 300 and 1500 m. As might be expected it is cold-resistant and able to tolerate occasional light frost, slowly growing to a tall branched tree, about 17 m at maturity, and perched on stilt-like aerial roots. The crown is made up of linear leaves 5 m long, pale-green, with finely toothed margins, rarely up to 6 m long (exceeded in the genus only by Pandanus laxespicatus). The leathery flower spathes are golden-yellow, the lowermost are largest and about 1m in length. These give rise to cone-like fruit, 15–25 cm long, that are bright orange to red when mature and consist of numerous 5-6 angled drupes; they are edible and sweet-tasting.

This species was first described by William Roxburgh in 1814 in Hortus Bengalensis, from a specimen growing in the East India Company's Botanical Garden at Calcutta. Some two centuries later it has become a popular plant in cold climate gardens, though it is also cultivated throughout the tropics and subtropics. The tree from which the colour plate was made by Matilda Smith, was acquired in 1888 by Kew from a Ghent nurseryman, who believed it to have originated from Madagascar. Besides the Himalayan region, the species also occurs naturally in China in Guangxi, Xizang and Yunnan, also in Myanmar and in Java, Sumatra and Malaysia.

== Ethnobotany ==
Lepet prepared specially for Eid al-Fitr in Jakarta is wrapped in the leaves, which are locally known as jelutuk. Malays in the Meliau subdistrict call the plant ledang and use it for wrapping food. The fruit and seeds are eaten across much of its range as a food or medicine, while the roots are eaten for medicinal value. Extracts from the leaves, stems and roots are used in India to treat dysentery.

The Serampas people of Sumatra call the plant pandan singkil, and cultivate it near dwellings to ward off malevolent spirits.

In many parts of its range, the plant is used to make mats or for other weaving, and usage in China (where the synonym Pandanus urophyllus is commonly used) as a textile or fibrous weaving material extends to use in roofing, as well as in a variety of cultural applications. Pandanus leaves are used for weaving pandan mats, ropes, house-building materials, hats and carrying bags. Among the Orang Rimba people, the plant is called Mengkuang ladang, and its textile use extends to the production of sumpit cases which hold tobacco or cigarettes. Its cultivation for textile use is reported in parts of its range where fruiting does not occur, where it may be called iro'ut or pandan kowang in Indonesia's East Seram Regency.

Known as Cangkuang in the Sundanese language, it is also used for ritual uses, in which context, it lends its name to the temple Cangkuang.

== See also ==
- Domesticated plants and animals of Austronesia
