= Bojongmenje =

Hindu temple in Indonesia

Bojongmenje Temple
- Candi Bojongmenje
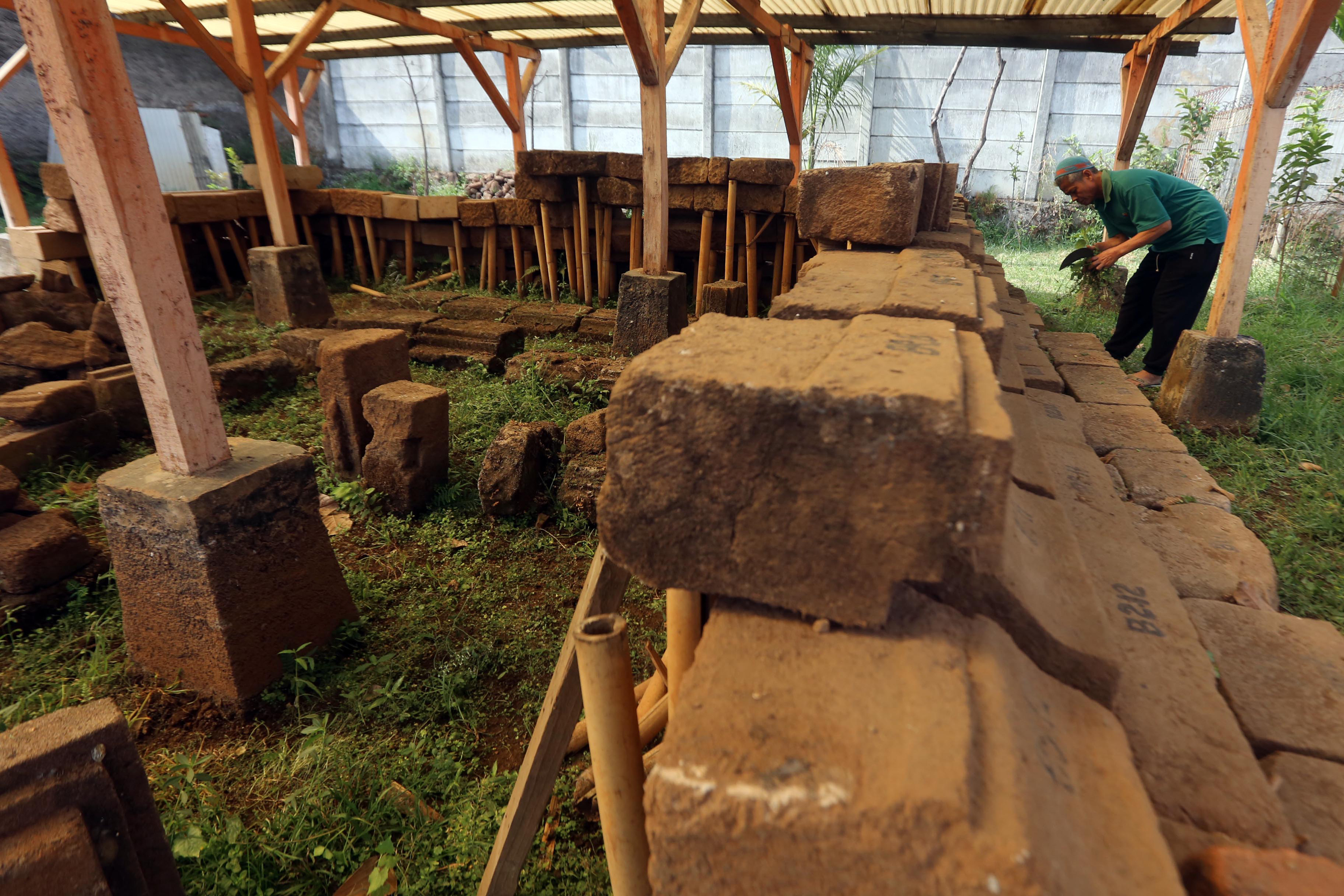
- Ruins of Bojongmenje
- Interactive map of the Bojongmenje Temple area

General information
- Architectural style: Candi
- Location: Bandung Regency, West Java., Indonesia
- Coordinates: 6°57′57″S 107°48′6″E

Bojongmenje is a 7th-century Hindu candi (temple) ruins located in Bojongmenje hamlet, Cangkuang village, Rancaekek subdistrict, Bandung Regency, West Java, Indonesia. Bojongmenje is one of few temples ever discovered in West Java.

== History ==
The temple ruins was discovered by locals on 18 August 2002 in a cemetery behind a textile factory. A month later the archeologist team conducted an excavation and successfully revealed the base of the temple pedestal structure, which was the remains of a temple.

== Structure ==
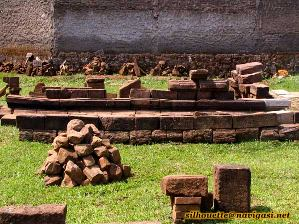
The stones structure remains of Bojongmenje temple.

The temple is located on Priangan highland, at an altitude of 698 metres above sea level. The temple was made with andesite stone as building material. The temple have a square base plan with a side length of 6 metres. The shape of the temple building is simple and the walls consist only of one layer without bas-relief and decoration. Geological study of the temple stone estimates that the age of the Bojongmenje temple ranges from the 5th century to the 7th century. Based on archaeological findings on the Bojongmenje site, it is estimated that the temple was built between 7th and 8th centuries. This means Bojongmenje temple is one of the oldest temples in Java island, older than the temples of Central and East Java, or at least in the same period with the Dieng temples in Central Java.

== See also ==
- Batujaya
- Cangkuang
- Candi of Indonesia
- Cetiya
