= Batujaya =

Archeological site in West Java, Indonesia

Batujaya Temple Complex
- Jiwa Temple
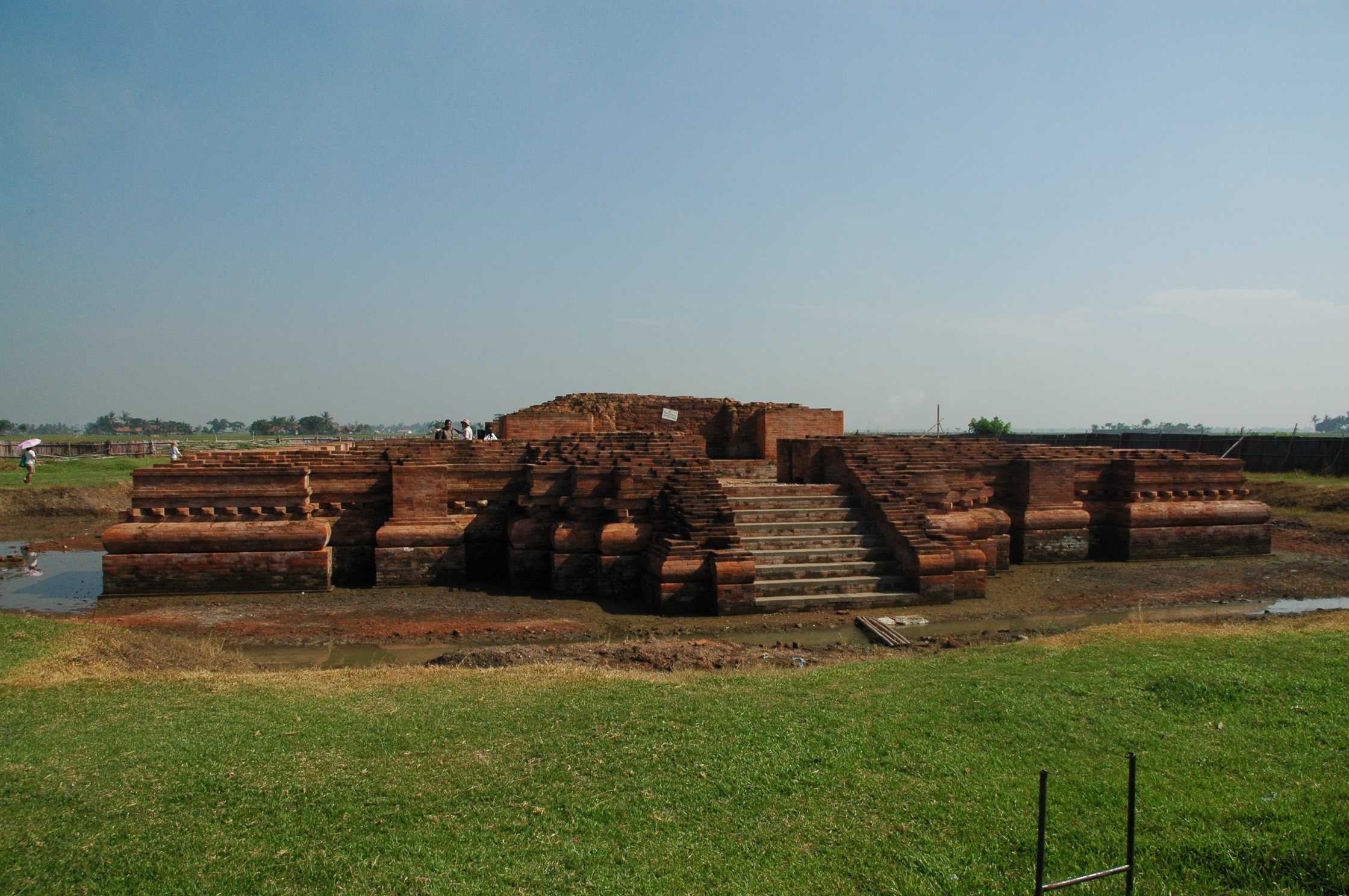
- Blandongan temple, one of Batujaya temples
- Interactive map of Batujaya Temple Complex
- 6.05563°S 107.15351°E
- Type: Candi
- Periods: Early Hindu-Buddhist period (2nd–6th century CE).
- Cultures: Possibly Tarumanegara
- Location: Karawang, West Java, Indonesia
- Region: Java

Site notes
- Excavation dates: 1984
- Archaeologists: University of Indonesia archeologists
- Condition: ruined

Batujaya is an archeological site located in the village of Batujaya, Karawang in West Java, Indonesia. Archaeologists suggest that the Batujaya temples might be the oldest surviving temple structures in Java and estimated that it was built during the time of the Tarumanegara kingdom circa 5th to 6th century AD.

The site has an area of five square kilometers and contains at least 30 structures which in Sundanese are called hunyur, or unur (high mounds of earth consisting of artifacts). Unur is similar to the manapo found at the Muara Jambi archaeological site.

== Structure of the sites ==
The site was first found and examined by archaeologists from the University of Indonesia in 1984. Excavations have since uncovered 17 unur, of which three are in the form of pools. The structures found are made of bricks composed of a mixture of clay and rice husks, not volcanic rock which is difficult to find in Batujaya. Two structures recovered are in the form of temples, one of which, known as Jiwa Temple, has been restored. According to Dr. Tony Djubiantono, the head of Bandung Archeology Agency, Jiwa was built in the 2nd-century.

As local Indonesian governments do not maintain the site, Ford provides funds for research and excavation of the Batujaya complex as part of its Conservation and Environmental Grants.

Advance technology has been applied for the construction with some of the floor and other parts of the temple which require hardening made of unreinforced concrete with marble-size stones and some of the temple are also coated with a thick enough of stucco.

== History ==
The discovery of this archaeological site was important as it was within the location of Tarumanagara, the oldest Hindu-Buddhist kingdom in Indonesia; West Java lacks ancient temple remains. Before the discovery, only four temple sites have been found in West Java, namely they are Cangkuang temple (in Garut), Ronggeng Temple, Pamarican Temple, and Pananjung Temple (in Ciamis).

Preliminary research at Jiwa found that the temple was built between the fifth and sixth centuries. This is based on the inscriptions found on numerous votive tablets discovered in the area, small clay tablets with inscriptions and pictures of Buddha used in prayer. Prof. Dr. Budihartono, a senior anthropologist from the University of Indonesia, proposed carrying out pollen analysis for examining both the paleoenvironment and also cultural records, including evidence of diet and food processing.

In and around the site is also discovered the fragments of Buni culture clay pottery, which suggests the Buni culture, spread across the northern coast of West Java, was the predecessor of the Batujaya site.

In April 2019, the complex was declared as an Indonesian national cultural treasure.

== See also ==
- Bojongmenje
- Buddhism in Indonesia
- Cangkuang
- Candi of Indonesia
- Cetiya
- Hinduism in Indonesia
- Sunda Wiwitan
