= Cangkuang =

Hindu temple in West Java, Indonesia

Cangkuang Temple
- Candi Cangkuang
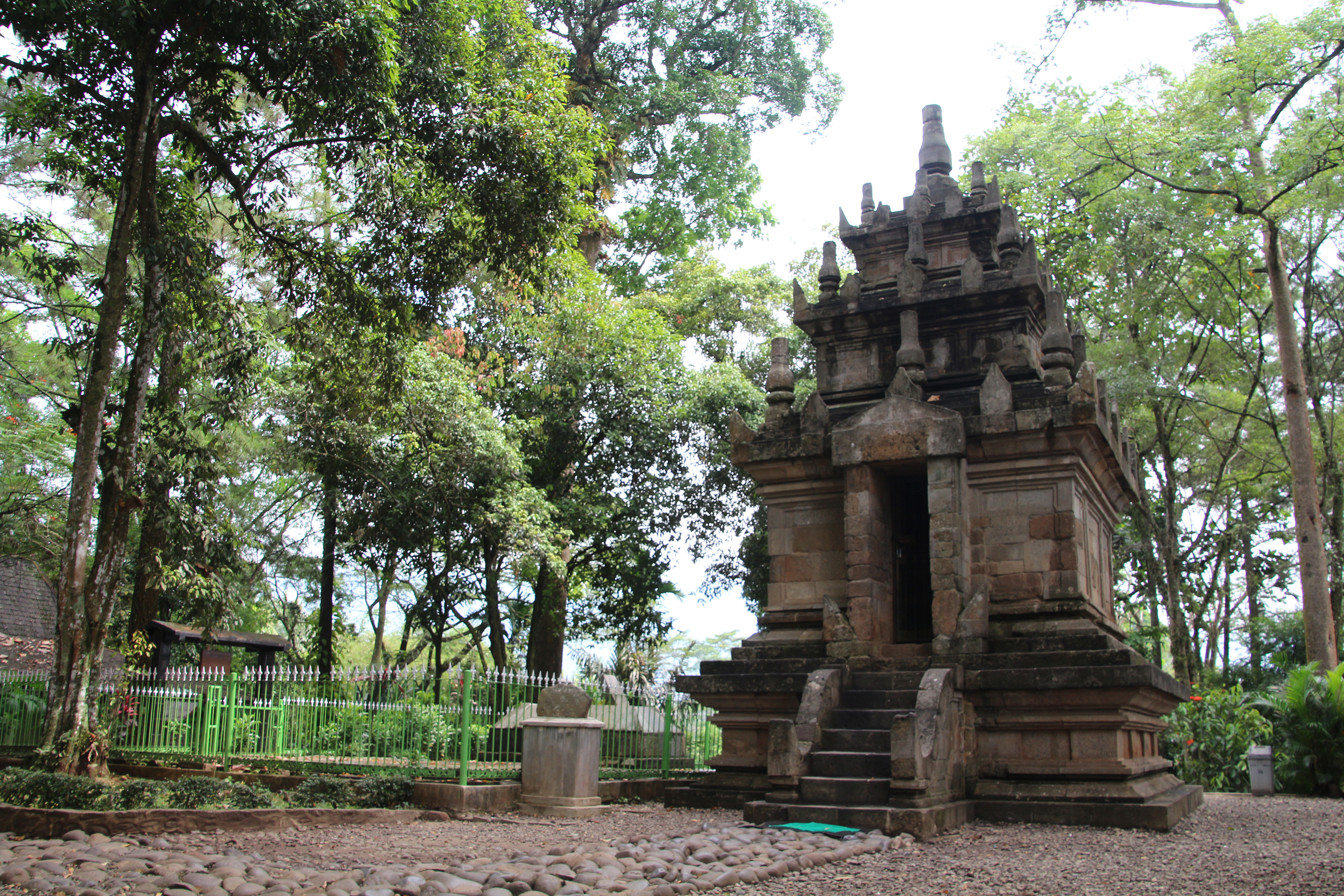
- Cangkuang temple

- Location within Java Location within Indonesia

General information
- Architectural style: Candi
- Location: Garut Regency, West Java., Indonesia
- Coordinates: 7.1030751°S 107.9190392°E

Cangkuang temple (Indonesian: Candi Cangkuang) is a small 8th-century Shivaist candi (Hindu temple) located in Kampung Pulo village, Cangkuang, Kecamatan Leles, Garut Regency, West Java, Indonesia. The temple is one of very few Hindu-Buddhist temples discovered in West Java, other temples include Batujaya and Bojongmenje temple.

Three meters to the south of the temple is an ancient Islamic tomb of Embah Dalem Arief Muhammad, believed to be the community elders of Cangkuang village during the Islamization of Sundanese in the 17th century.

== Location ==
The town of Leles is around 40 kilometers southeast of Bandung on the way to Garut. The temple is located several kilometers east of the Leles-Garut main road. The temple occupies a 16.5 hectares island called Kampung Pulo ("island village") surrounded by a small lake (Sundanese: situ) called Situ Cangkuang. Near the temple there is a traditional Sundanese village. The temple, tomb, traditional village and the areas surrounding the island and lake, it is a cultural and archaeological sanctuary. Originally the whole island was surrounded by the lake, however today the lake receded and water only fill the northern parts, while the southern parts of the lake are reclaimed and cultivated as a paddy field. The temple's name cangkuang, was derived from Sundanese native name for the pandan tree (Pandanus furcatus) found around the temple in Kampung Pulo island.

== Description ==
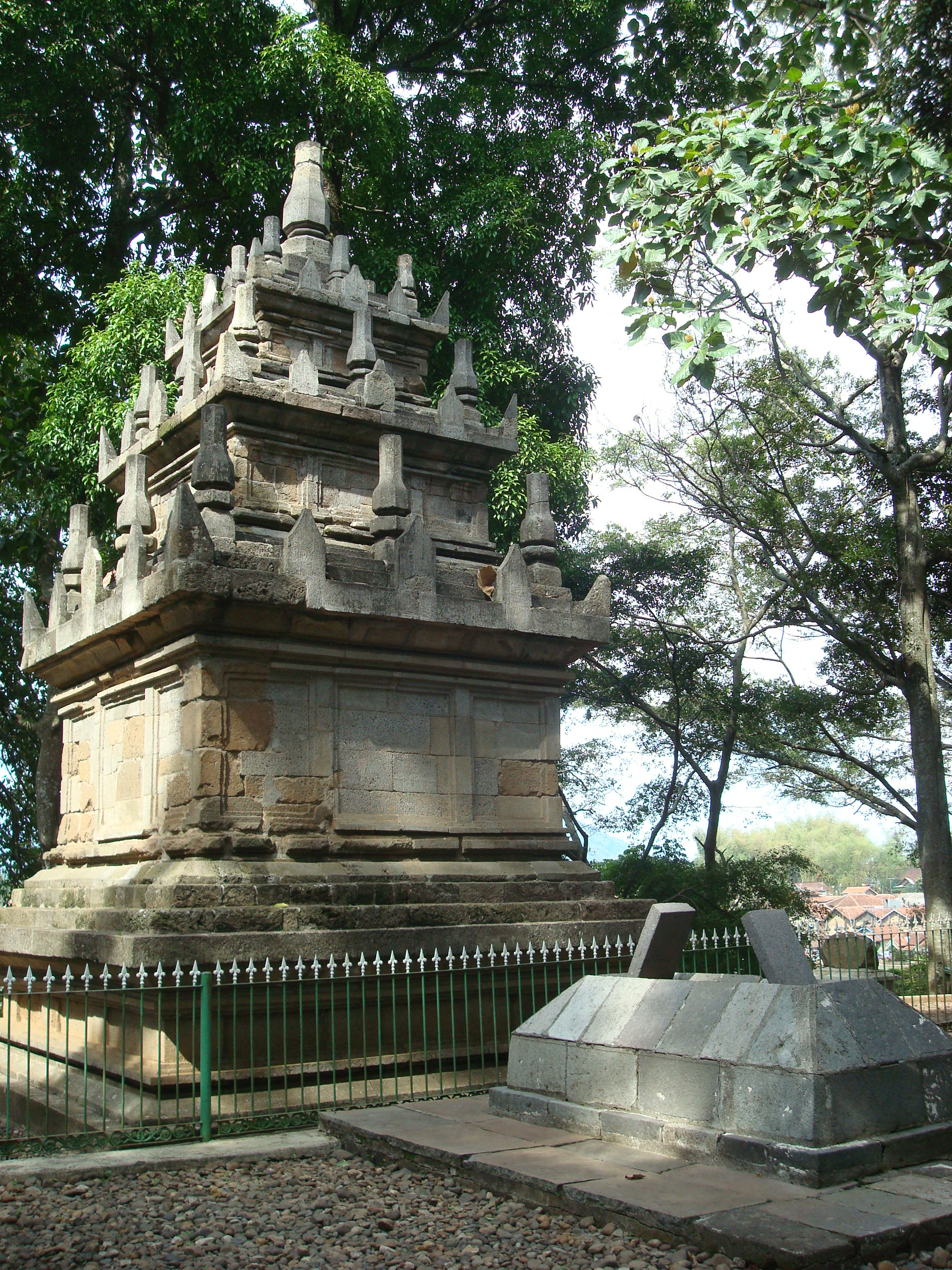
Cangkuang temple and the Islamic tomb of Arief Muhammad on the foreground.

The temple is made from andesite stones, the temple's base measures 4.5 x 4.5 meters and 8.5 meters tall. The temple faces east, on the east side there is a flight of stairs leading to the portal and a small main room (garbhagriha). Inside the main room there is a small 62 cm tall stone statue of Shiva. The statue is damaged, the hands are broken and the face is quite eroded. On the pedestal of the statue there is a carving of Nandi's head. The temple is quite simple and unadorned with minimal ornaments. The roof is arranged in three receding steps adorned with pseudo-lingam pinnacles. The architectural style is similar to those of early Central Javanese Hindu temples. Judging from the stone decay degradation and the simple style of the temple, experts estimate that the temple is dated from the early 8th-century, about the same age as the Dieng temples, and slightly older than temples of southern Central Java such as Prambanan.

Cangkuang temple

== See also ==
- Bojongmenje
- Batujaya
- Candi of Indonesia
- Cetiya
