= Purnawarman =

King of Tarumanagara

- Narèndraddhvajabhūténa
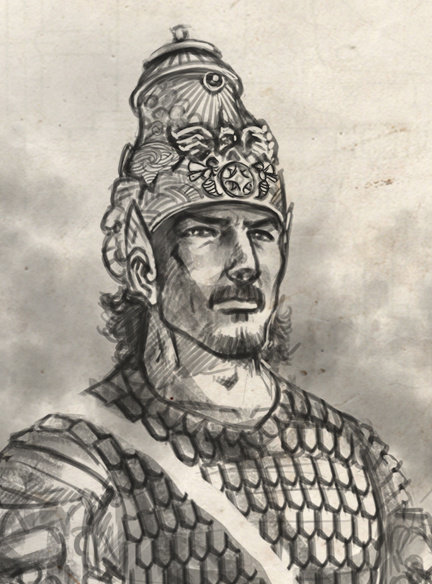

3rd King of Tarumanegara
- Reign: 395 AD – 434 AD
- Predecessor: Dharmayawarman
- Successor: Wisnuwarman
- Born: 16 March 372 AD
- Died: 23 November 434 AD
- Issue: Wisnuwarman
Regnal name
- Sri Maharaja Purnawarman Sang Iswara Digwijaya Bhimaparakrama Suryamahapurusa Jagatpati ᮞᮢᮤ ᮙᮠᮛᮏ ᮕᮥᮁᮔᮝᮁᮙᮔ᮪ ᮞᮀ ᮄᮞ᮪ᮝᮛ ᮓᮤᮌ᮪ᮝᮤᮏᮚ ᮘ᮪ᮠᮤᮙᮕᮛᮊᮢᮙ ᮞᮥᮛᮡᮙᮠᮕᮥᮛᮥᮞ ᮏᮌᮒ᮪ᮕᮒᮤ
- House: Warman Dynasty
- Father: Dharmayawarman

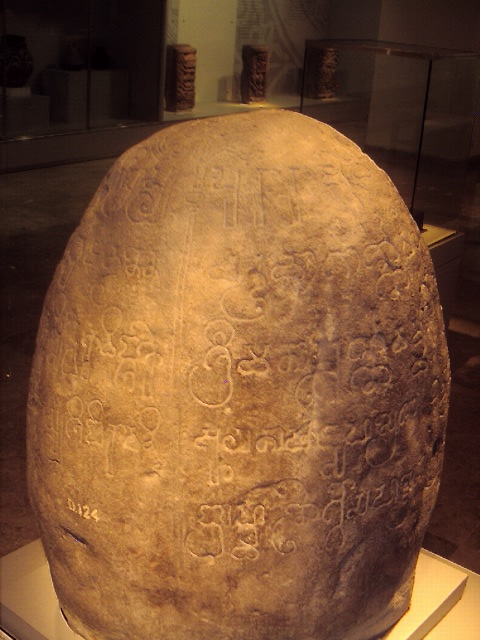
Tugu inscription now displayed in National Museum, mentioned about King Purnawarman of Tarumanagara

Purnawarman or Purnavarman was the 5th-century king of Tarumanagara, a Hindu Indianized kingdom, located in modern-day West Java, Jakarta and Banten provinces, Indonesia. Purnawarman reigned during the 5th century, and during his reign he created several stone inscriptions.

According to these inscriptions he embarked on a hydraulic project and also identified himself to Vishnu, which indicates him and his kingdom were adhering to the Vishnuite faith. King Purnawarman established a new capital city for the kingdom, located somewhere near present-day Tugu (North Jakarta) or Bekasi.

His name in Sanskrit means "perfect shield" or "complete protector". Later Tarumanagaran kings are only known from their names, all bear the name warman (Sanskrit: varman means "shield" or "protector") which suggests that all of them belongs to the same dynasty.

== Historiography ==
Purnawarman is the most well known ruler among Tarumanagaran kings, mostly because he extensively created numbers of stone inscriptions, proclaiming his deeds and feats. He left seven memorial stones with inscriptions bearing his name spread across today Jakarta, Banten and West Java provinces. These seven inscriptions areː

1. Tugu inscription
2. Ciaruteun inscription
3. Kebon Kopi inscription
4. Jambu inscription
5. Pasir Awi inscription
6. Muara Cianten inscription
7. Cidanghiang inscription

The Tugu inscription, which is written in Pallava script and is a few years older than the Ciaruteun inscription, is considered the oldest of all the inscriptions. There are more stones with inscriptions from the time of king Purnawarman, some close to Bogor city. They are Muara Cianten, Prasasti Pasir Awi, Cidanghiang, and Jambu inscriptions. Cidanghiang inscription sits further to the west at Lebak in the Pandeglang area, consisting of two lines, proclaiming Purnawarman as the example for rulers around the world. Jambu inscription, with a two-line inscription in Pallava and Sanskrit, bears the large footprints of the king. The inscription translates as:

The name of the king who is famous of faithfully executing his duties and who is incomparable (peerless) is Sri Purnawarman who reigns Taruma. His armour cannot be penetrated by the arrows of his enemies. The prints of the foot soles belong to him who was always successful to destroy the fortresses of his enemies, and was always charitable and gave honorable receptions to those who are loyal to him and hostile to his enemies.

The Wangsakerta manuscript, which experts believe to be a 20th-century forgery, notes in parwa II sarga 3 (page 159 – 162) that under the reign of King Purnawarman, Tarumanagara held control over 48 small kingdoms with area stretching from Salakanagara or Rajatapura to Purwalingga (current city of Purbalingga in Central Java Province). Traditionally Cipamali river (Brebes river) was the border between Sunda and Java. However, this claim is not reliable because the Wangsakerta manuscript is not an authentic historical source.
