= Tarumanagara =

Former kingdom in Indonesia

Coordinates: 6°20′S 106°54′E

State of Taruma ᮒᮛᮥᮙᮔᮌᮛ Prahajyan Tarumanagara (Old Sundanese)
- ca. 358 AD–669 AD
- Territory of Tarumanagara
- Capital: Sundapura (between North Jakarta and Bekasi Regency)
- Common languages: Old Sundanese; Sanskrit
- Religion: Hinduism; Buddhism; Animism; Sunda Wiwitan
- Government: Monarchy
- History
  - Established: ca. 358 AD
  - Invasion by Sriwijaya: 669 AD
Preceded by	Succeeded by
Buni culture	Sunda Kingdom; Galuh Kingdom
- Today part of: Indonesia

Tarumanagara or Taruma Kingdom or just Taruma was an early Sundanese Indianised kingdom, located in western Java, whose 5th-century ruler, Purnawarman, produced the earliest known inscriptions in Java, which are estimated to date from around 358 AD.

At least seven stone inscriptions connected to this kingdom were discovered in Western Java area, near Bogor and Jakarta. They are Ciaruteun, Kebon Kopi, Jambu, Pasir Awi, and Muara Cianten inscriptions near Bogor; Tugu inscription near Cilincing in North Jakarta; and Cidanghiang inscription in Lebak village, Munjul district, south of Banten.

== Location ==
The inscriptions of Taruma kingdom are the earliest records of Hinduism in the western part of the archipelago. The geographical position of coastal West Java, which corresponds to today modern Jakarta, is a commanding region that controls the Sunda Strait. This location is strategic in regard to Sumatra, and also its connection to Asian continent of India and China.

The kingdom was located not far from modern Jakarta, and according to the Tugu inscription Purnawarman apparently built a canal that changed the course of the Cakung River, and drained a coastal area for agriculture and settlement. In his inscriptions, Purnavarman associated himself with Vishnu, and Brahmins secured the hydraulic project through ritual. Tarumanagara is believed to have existed between 358 and 669 CE in the Western Java region, in and around modern-day Bogor, Bekasi and Jakarta, which roughly corresponds to modern Greater Jakarta area.

The earliest known written records of Tarumanagara's existence were inscribed in stone inscriptions. Inscribed stone is called prasasti in Indonesian. Numbers of stone inscriptions dated from Tarumanagara period were discovered in Western Java region.

== Historiography ==
The historiography of the Taruma kingdom were mostly uncovered, acquired and constructed from two main sources; the primary record of the stone inscriptions discovered near present-day Bogor and Jakarta, and Chinese chronicles dated from the Sui and Tang dynasties.

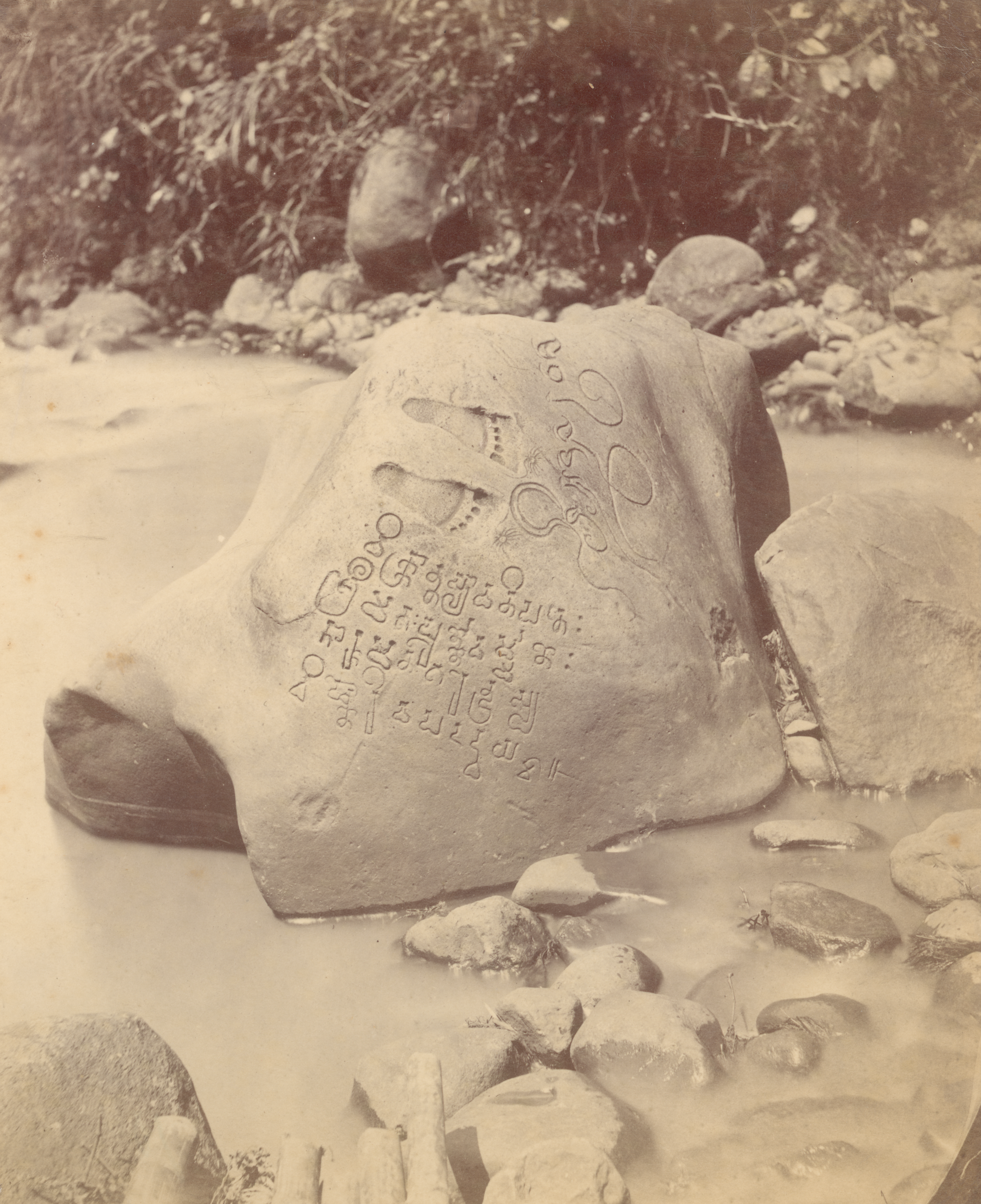
Ciaruteun inscription discovered by Tjiaroeteun river near Buitenzorg, photographed before 1900.

In 1863, Dutch East Indies, a huge boulder of inscribed stone was spotted near Ciampea not far from Buitenzorg (Bogor). The stone inscription was discovered on the river bed of Ciaruteun river, a tributary of Cisadane River. It is today known as the Ciaruteun inscription, dated from the 5th century, written in Vengi letters (used in the Indian Pallava period) and in Sanskrit language. This is the earliest inscription that clearly mentioned the kingdom's name "Tarumanagara". The inscription reports the most famous king of Tarumanagara.

"The powerful illustrious and brave King, the famous Purnawarman (of the) Tarumanagara (kingdom) whose (print of the) foot soles are the same (as those of) God Vishnu."

— Ciaruteun inscription.

Located nearby is the Kebon Kopi I inscription, also called Telapak Gadjah stone, with an inscription and the engraving of two large elephant footprints. The inscription read:

"These elephant foot soles, akin to those of the strong Airavata (elephant, which God Indra used to ride), belongs to Tarumanagara King who is successful and full of control.."

— Kebon Kopi I inscription.

Not only the stones testify of the existence of King Purnawarman and his Tarumanagara kingdom, but also Chinese historical sources, since Tarumanagara maintained extended trade and diplomatic relations in the territory stretching between India and China. The Chinese Buddhist Monk Fa Xian reported in his book Fo-kuo-chi (佛國記) (414 AD) that he stayed on the island of Ye-po-ti (耶婆提.Chinese spelling of Javadvipa), most probably the western part of Java island, for six months, from December 412 AD until May 413 AD. He reported that the Law of Buddha was not much known, but that the Brahmans (Hinduism) flourished, and heretics (animists) too.

Between the period 528 AD to 669 AD, Tarumanagara sent their embassy to Chinese court. The kingdom was mentioned in the annals of the Sui dynasty, the king of To-lo-mo (possibly 塔鲁纳) (Taruma) has sent diplomatic mission, which arrived in China in 528 and 535. It was mentioned that the kingdom is located far south of China. (Note: Cannot find any direct reference to the name "Tarumanagara" in primary sources before Tang dynasty. It is only referenced in records of Tang dynasty, as "多羅磨" (duó-luó-mó, Middle Chinese: /talama/). (Note: 《新唐書·卷二二二下》：單單，在振州東南，多羅磨之西，亦有州縣。) Sui dynasty lasts from 581 to 619, so the reference to Sui is improper. Actually the mentioned diplomatic missions are recorded in annals of Liang dynasty. The first one, (Note: 《梁書·卷三》：乙酉，芮芮國遣使獻方物。) happened in 528 (大通二年), is a misreading. It refers to 芮芮國 (Kingdom of ruìruì) which is Rouran. The second one, (Note: 《梁書·卷三》：二月……辛丑，高麗國、丹丹國各遣使獻方物。) happened in 535 (大同元年), is quite close. It refers to 丹丹國 (Kingdom of dān-dān) which is probably transliteration of Tendong, and is considered to be a kingdom in malay peninsula by scholars. This kingdom has another mission arrived in 531, (Note: 《梁書·卷三》：六月丁未……丹丹國遣使獻方物。) but is neglected here. Further, the name "塔魯納" is not seen in any chinese source, except for the wikipedia article 信訶沙里, which doesn't give any sources.)

The annals of Tang dynasty also mentioned in the year 666 AD and 669 AD the envoys of To-lo-mo has visited the court of Tang. (Note: This is also not true, because there's no direct mention of "Tarumanagara". The name "多羅磨" (duó-luó-mó, Middle Chinese: /talama/) is not listed as an independent entry, but only mentioned in the description of 單單國 (Kingdom of dān-dān, i.e. 丹丹國). It reads as "Kingdom of Dandan (Tendong), situated southeast of Zhenzhou (present-day sanya), and west of Duoluomo (Taruma), also possessed established prefectures and counties (which implies they are not barbarian)". Apparently, the so called envoys are still from Dandan, (Note: 《新唐書·卷二二二下》：乾封、總章時，獻方物。) as in previous paragraph, not Taruma.)

The history of Sunda kingdom and its predecessor (Tarumanagara and Salakanagara) is recorded quite detailed in Pustaka Rajyarajya i Bhumi Nusantara (simply known as Nusantara), a book within Wangsakerta manuscripts collection composed in late 17th century Cirebon. However, currently the Wangsakerta manuscripts are generally discounted as a valid historical source among historians, since this controversial manuscript is suspected as a fraud containing pseudohistory.

== Etymology ==
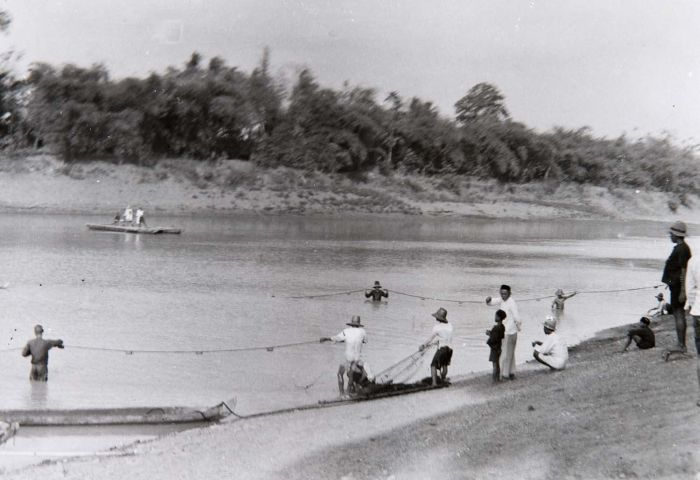
Citarum river in West Java, etymologically connected to Taruma kingdom.

The name Tarumanagara was found in several inscriptions in the Western Java region dated from circa 4th century. The Chinese chronicle also recorded the name "多羅磨" (Standard Chinese: duó-luó-mó, Middle Chinese: /talama/) which suggest the Chinese pronunciation of "Taruma". Tarumanagara means the kingdom of Taruma. The name "Taruma" itself is connected to the Citarum River of West Java. In Sundanese language, ci means water or river while tarum means indigo plant. Tarum is local name of indigo plant that used to create the indigo dyeing pigment.

== History ==
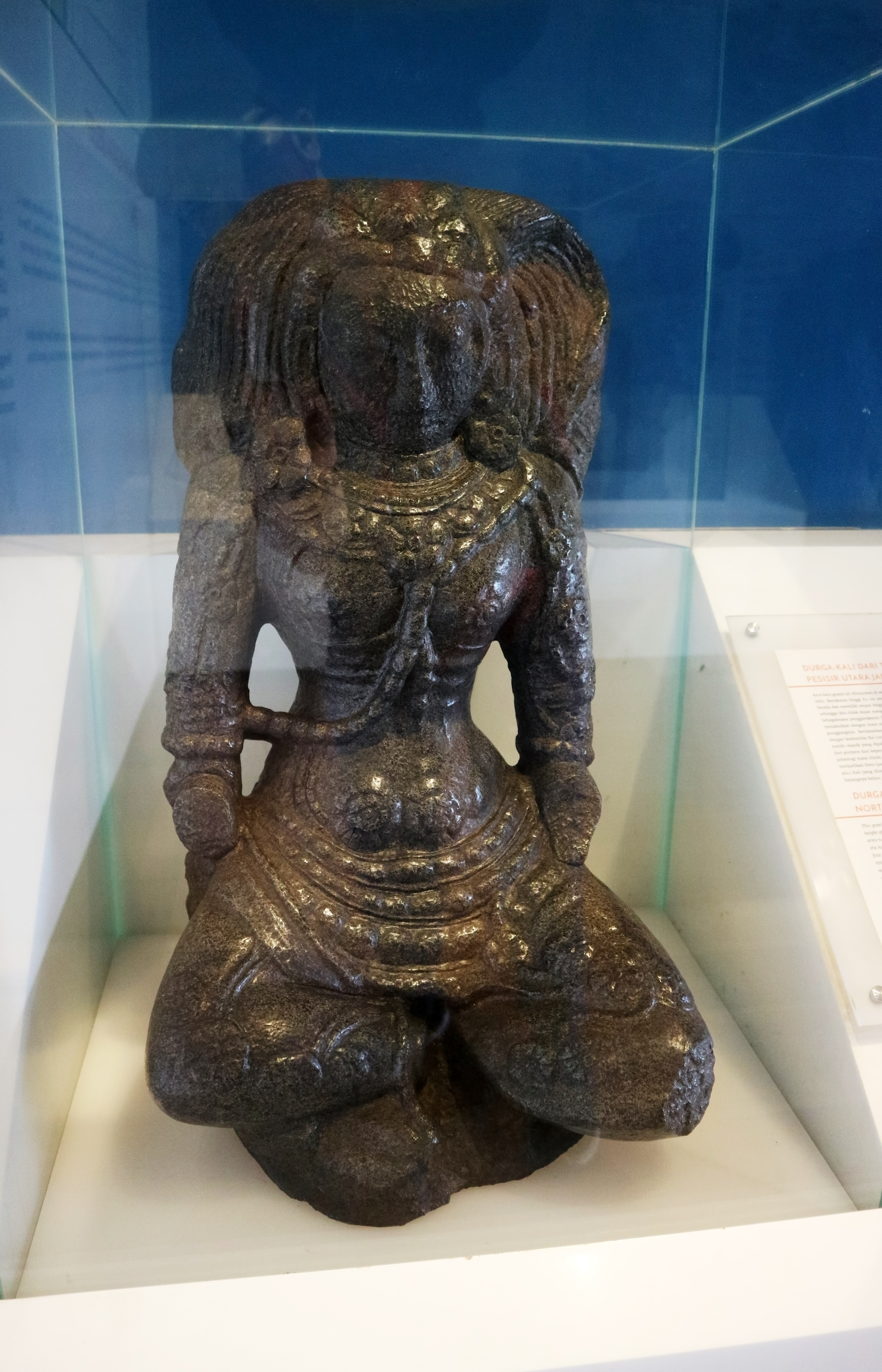
Statue of Kali from Tanjung Priok, North Jakarta

Around 400 BC to 100 AD, a prehistoric clay pottery culture was flourished in northern coastal Western Java. This clay pottery culture is identified as Buni culture, named after its first discovered archaeological site, Buni village in Babelan, Bekasi, east of Jakarta. Archaeologist suggests that this culture was the predecessor of Taruma kingdom. This is affirmative regarding its connection to Batujaya archaeological site. The ancient society that supported the Buni culture was Indianised; absorbing Hindu influences from India, and establishing early Hindu polity in Java.

According to the book Geographike Hyphegesis written in 2nd-century Roman Empire, a Greek geographer Claudius Ptolemaeus mentioned about countries in the far east of the known world then. Among others is a city called Argyre on the western edge of the Iabadiou island. Iabadiou can be equated in Sanskrit as Yawadwipa, which corresponds to the island of Java. The name argyre means "silver", while in local Indonesian and Sundanese language, silver is called perak, which sound similar to the Merak port town on the western edge of Java.

=== Age of Purnawarman ===
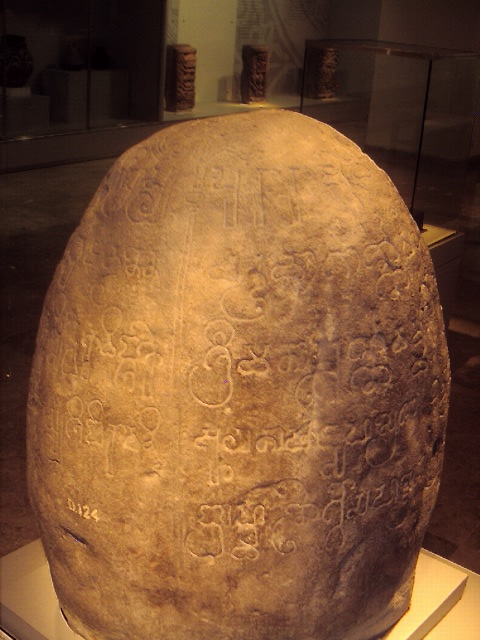
Inscription from the era of Purnawarman, undated, founded in Tugu sub-district of Jakarta.

The history of the Tarumanegara Kingdom comes from a number of inscriptions dating from the 5th century AD. The inscriptions are named based on the location where they were found, namely the Ciaruteun inscription, the Pasir Koleangkak inscription, the Kebonkopi inscription, the Tugu inscription, the Pasir Awi inscription, the Muara Cianten inscription, and the Cidanghiang inscription. The inscription mentions the name of the ruling king is Purnawarman. Cidanghiang inscription (sits further to the west at Lebak in the Pandeglang area), consisting of two lines, proclaiming Purnawarman as the standard for rulers around the world. Jambu inscription, with a two-line inscription in Pallava/Sanskrit, bears the large footprints of the king. The inscription translates as:

The name of the king who is famous of faithfully executing his duties and who is incomparable (peerless) is Sri Purnawarman who reigns Taruma. His armour cannot be penetrated by the arrows of his enemies. The prints of the foot soles belong to him who was always successful to destroy the fortresses of his enemies, and was always charitable and gave honorable receptions to those who are loyal to him and hostile to his enemies.

=== Kings after Purnawarman ===
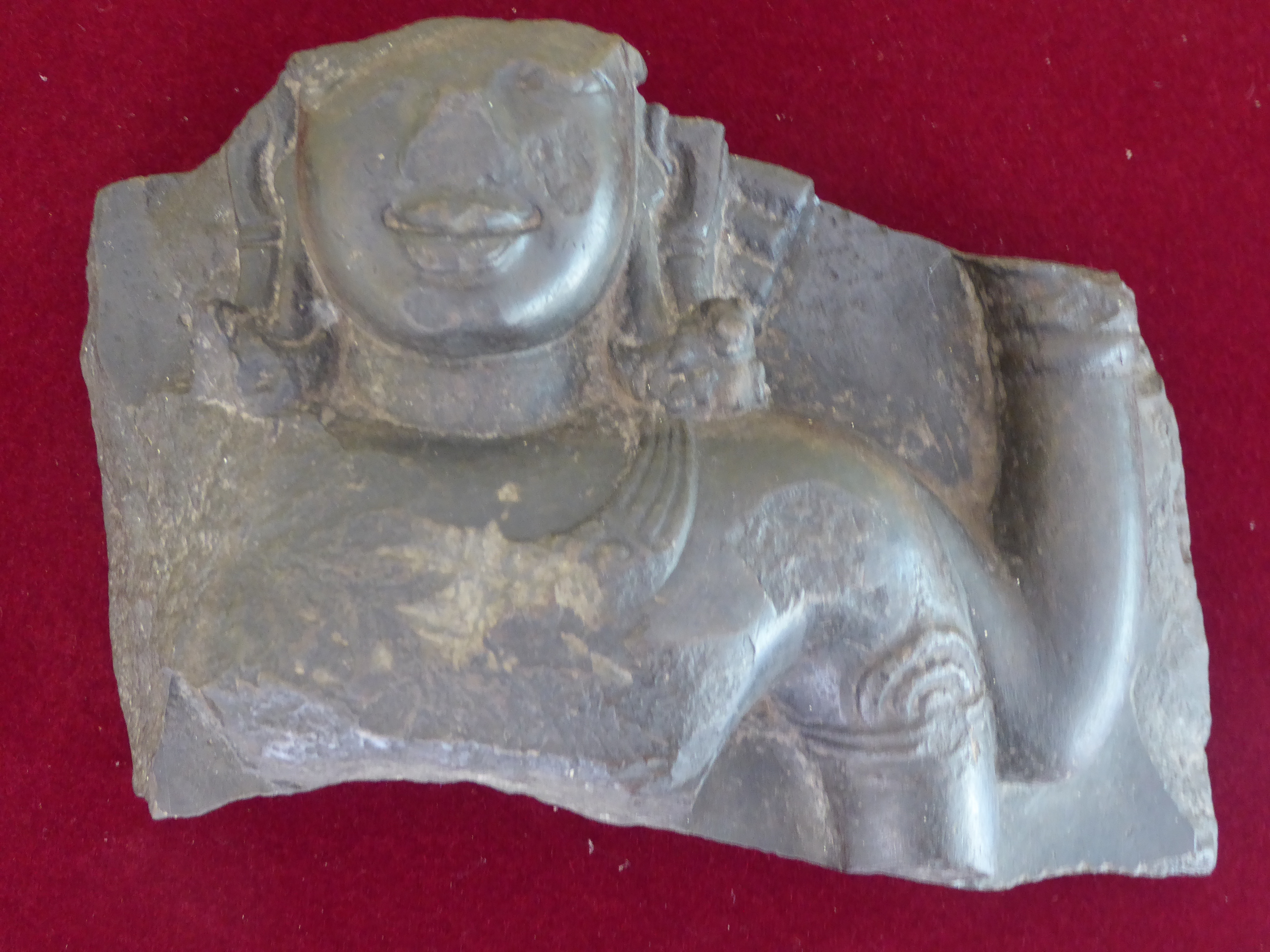
Fragment of Hindu god Vishnu discovered in Batujaya archaeological site, West Java.

Purnawarman probably is the most well-known king of Tarumanagara because he produced quite a number of well documented inscriptions. The records about Tarumanagara's later kings were scarce and obscure, most were known from later manuscripts and local traditions.

Later series of Tarumanagara kings are only known from their names, all bears the name warman (Sanskrit: varman means "shield" or "protector") which suggests that all of them belongs in the same dynasty.

A rather detailed information was known about King Suryawarman that ruled from 535 AD to 561 AD. King Suryawarman established a new capital city eastward and left Sundapura and its communities to preserve their own order. Then, Sundapura become a new smaller kingdom called Sunda Sambawa which was under control of Tarumanagara. Before the Suryavarman reigned Tarumanagara, Manikmaya, his son in-law, in 526, left Sundapura went southeastward and established Kendan, a new kingdom currently in Nagreg area, near modern Garut city.

Kertawarman ruled c. 561 AD to 628 AD. During this period the grandson of Manikmaya, Wretikandayun, in 612 AD, established Galuh Kingdom, southeast of current Garut with its capital city located in Banjar Pataruman. Kertawarman's successor, King Linggawarman ruled from 628 AD to 650 AD, he however produced no male heir. Linggawarman's eldest daughter Manasih, married to Tarusbawa, ruler of Sunda Sembawa. While the second daughter of King Linggawarman, Princess Sobakancana, married Dapunta Hyang Sri Jayanasa, who later established the Srivijaya kingdom.

=== Decline ===
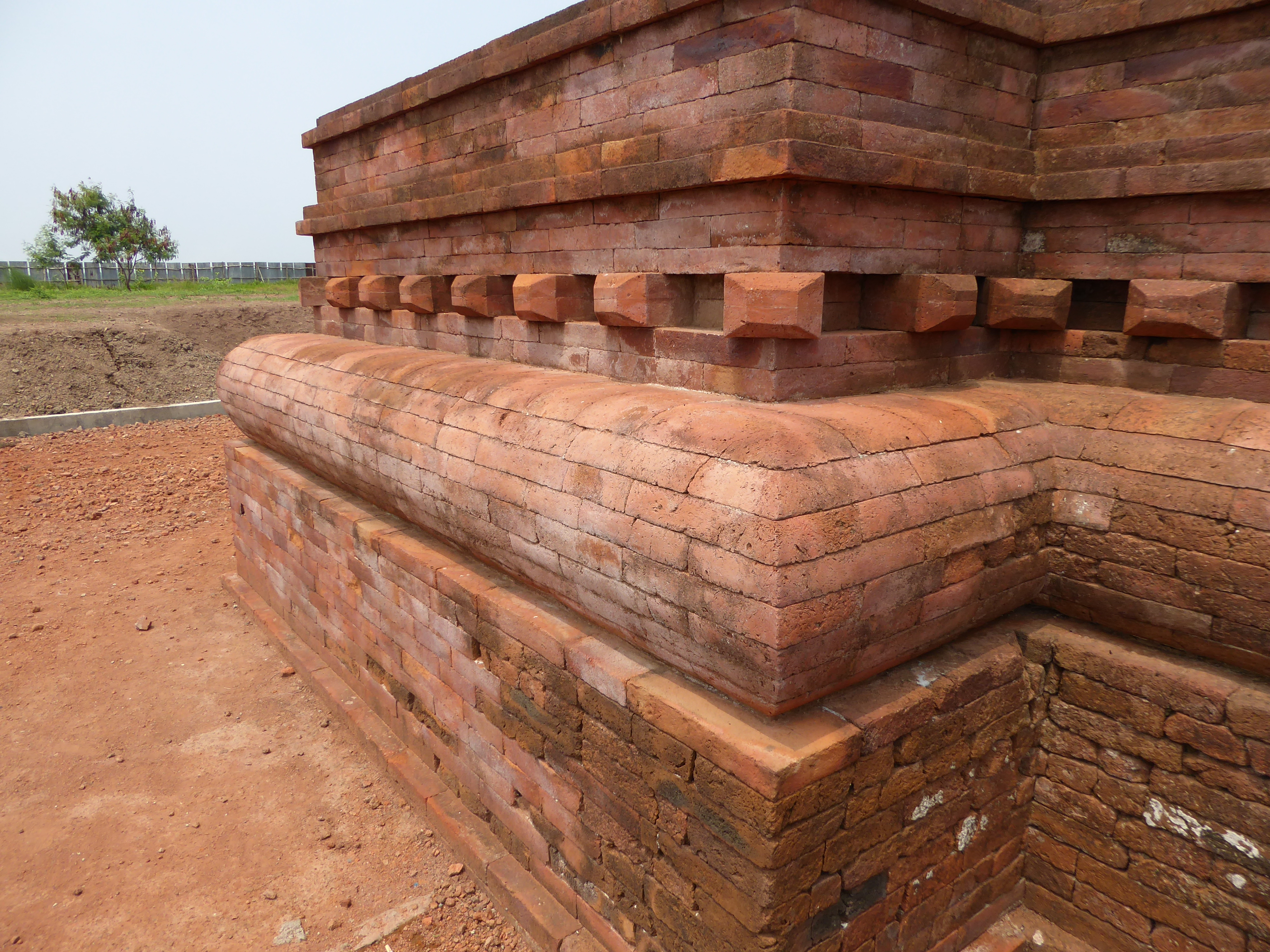
The fine brickwork on the base of Batujaya Buddhist stupa in Karawang, dated from late Tarumanagara period (5th–7th century) to early Srivijaya influence (7th–10th century).

According to 7th century Kota Kapur inscription, Srivijaya, centred in today Palembang, South Sumatra, launched a military expedition against Bhumi Jawa, the period coincides with the decline of Tarumanagara. It is very likely that Tarumanagara kingdom was attacked and defeated by Srivijaya around 686. The pretext behind Srivijayan campaign against Tarumanagara was obscure, however it was probably because of Jayanasa's own claim to Tarumanagara's throne, after all his wife, Sobakancana, is the daughter of Linggawarman, the late king of Tarumanagara. After this naval invasion, Tarumanegara's influence began to decline.

Devastated by Srivijayan invasion, King Tarusbawa then moved further inland to find a refuge in the south and established a new capital near the Cipakancilan river upstream (today in modern Bogor). It seems that he left the coastal areas of port of Sunda and Kalapa (today coastal areas of modern Banten and Jakarta) under Srivijayan mandala's control. This capital centuries later became the city of Pakuan Pajajaran (or shortly called Pakuan or Pajajaran). King Tarusbawa becomes the predecessor of Sunda kings.

== Economy ==
The Chinese source mentioned about the product being traded in Taruma, which suggests the population made a living in hunting, mining, fishing, trade and shipping; aside of agriculture and farming sector. The commodities being traded in Taruma was specific hunting products, such as rhino horn, ivory and turtle shell. Gold and silver were traded too, which suggest the active mining sector. The Tugu inscription mentioned about the construction of hydraulic projects through the construction canals. This irrigation project suggest that the area of northern West Java and Jakarta was transformed into irrigated rice paddies. The canals also meant as a water management to prevent flooding that often hit the capital of Tarumanagara.

== Religion ==
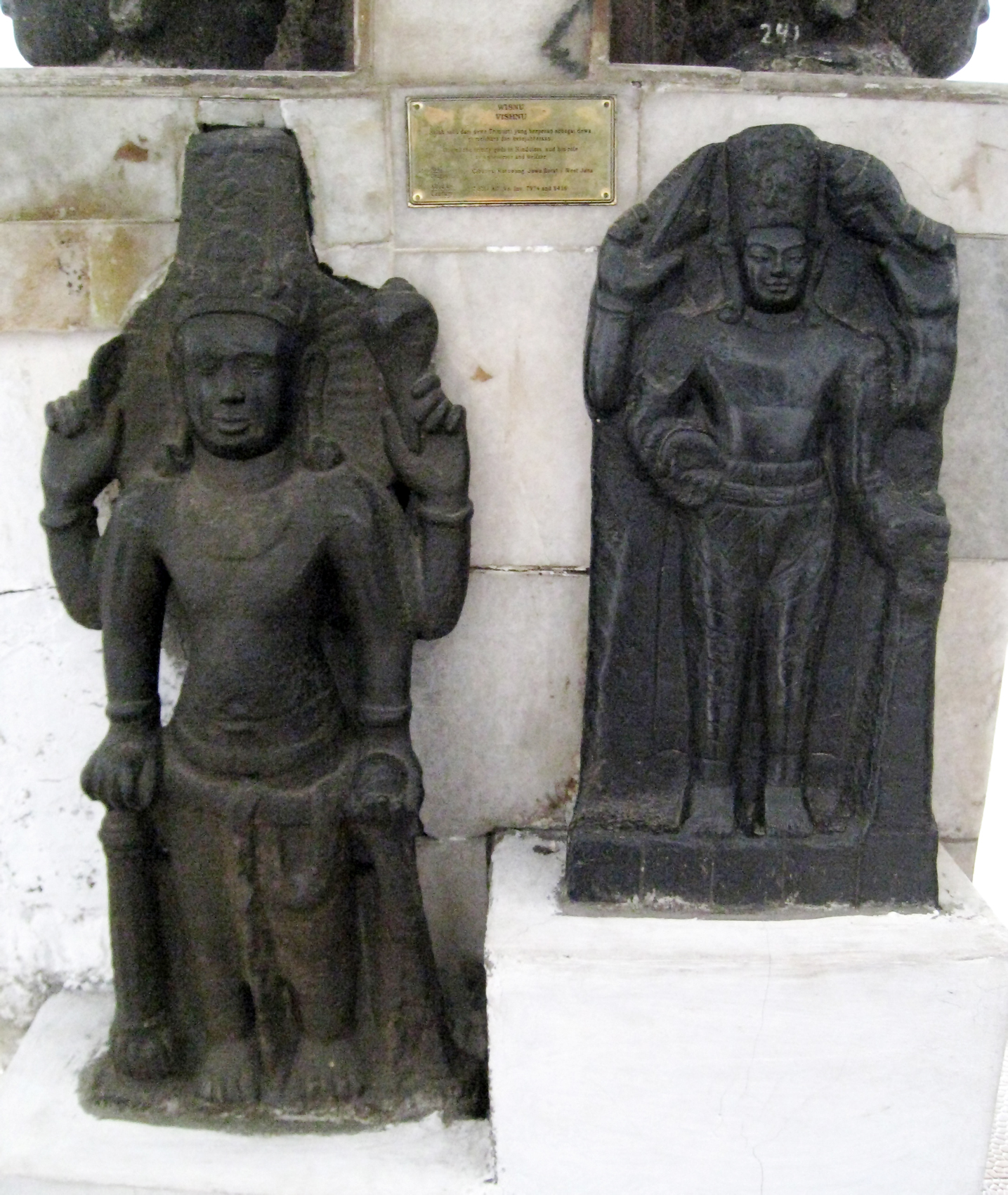
Two Vishnu statues from Cibuaya, Karawang, West Java. Tarumanagara c. 7th-8th century. The tubular crown bears similarities with Cambodian Khmer art.

According to the 4th century writings of Faxian, a Chinese Buddhist pilgrim that visited Tarumanagara in his journey to India; in the early 5th century there were three kinds of religions adhered by the population of Taruma kingdom; i.e. Buddhism just as adhered by Faxian himself, Hinduism, and a religion which he described as "impure" religion. The so-called "impure" religion probably refer to native animism beliefs practiced by local population prior of Hindu-Buddhist influence.

Hinduism was the main religion in Tarumanagara kingdom, at least among its elites ruling class. This is based on several inscriptions dated from Tarumanagara period. For example, Tugu inscription mentioned that the father of Purnawarman is titled as Rajadhiraja Guru has dug the canal in Chandrabhaga. Purnawarman himself credited for the construction of Gomati canal. The inscription also mentioned that King Purnawarman donated a thousand cows as gifts for Brahmins. These rituals demonstrate the Vedic Hinduism practice. The Ciaruteun inscription also demonstrated Vedic tradition; by equating the print of Purnawarman's soles with the foot of Hindu god Vishnu. Both Ciaruteun and Cidanghiang inscription mention vikkranta, which rever to Trivikrama or the "three steps" performed by of Vishnu avatar, Vamana. In Jambu inscription, Purnavarman was equated with Indra and Surya. The Vishnu statues from Cibuaya dated from 7th century, also the Rajarsi statue discovered in Jakarta, also testified of Hindu prevalence in Tarumanagara.

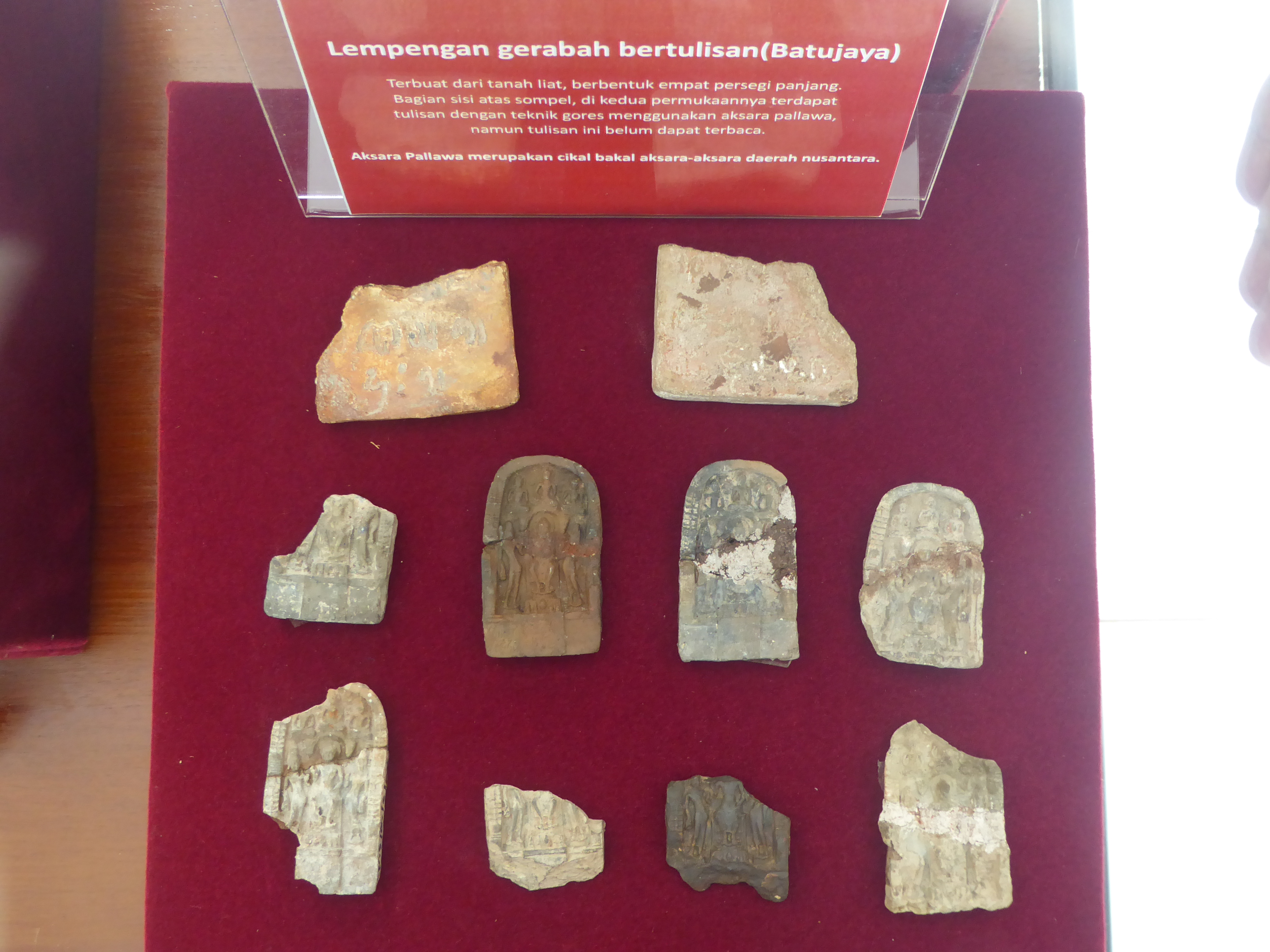
Buddhist clay votive tablets discovered at Batujaya stupa.

Buddhism was practiced in Tarumanagara as reported by Faxian in early 5th century. However, he said there were only a few Buddhists in the kingdom. Near the north coast of West Java, earth mounds called by locals as unur or hunur were discovered in the 1960s. The excavated earth mounds in the Batujaya archaeological site in Karawang (within the territory of Tarumanagara) have revealed that these earth mounds were actually red brick structures, either Candi (temples) or stupas.

In total, archeological finds have uncovered around 30 sites (13 are of brick temples) from the Batujaya archaeological complex. These 5th century findings are of temples, stupas, inscriptions and moulded clay tablets recovered from 1995, 1997 and 2001. Among these tablets include a Buddha seated on a throne, flanked by bodhissatvas and surrounded with tall stupas and topped by parasols. Besides this, a number of Buddhist votive tablets were discovered near Blandongan temple, also in the Batujaya archaeological site, confirming a Buddhist background of the site, and that the faith was indeed practiced in Tarumanagara.

The stratigraphy of Blandongan temple revealed several layers of cultures dated between 2nd–12th century. This means after the fall of Tarumanagara, the Buddhist site of Batujaya was still actively used. Which means the Batujaya temples was used between the 4th and 7th century during the Tarumanagara period; and continued well after the 7th–10th century, possibly under Srivijaya suzerainty.

== Legacy ==
Unlike its successor; the Sunda kingdom that still remembered in Pantun Sunda; the oral tradition of local Sundanese—Tarumanagara was completely forgotten among local population in West Java. It was not until late 19th century when archaeologist and historian finally deciphered the stone inscriptions discovered near Buitenzorg and Batavia. The discovery and study of numerous Tarumanagara inscriptions; especially those issued by King Purnawarman, had uncover that this kingdom was indeed the earliest Hindu polity in western Indonesia. Together with Kutai and Kalingga, Tarumanagara is remembered as a pioneer states that started the historical period of Indonesia.

Tarumanagara is especially important as the historical identity for the city of Bekasi and its surrounding area, since local historians believe that the capital of Tarumanagara was located in or around the present day Bekasi city. The name Chandrabhaga mentioned in Tarumanaga inscription believed was the ancient name of Bekasi—from Chandrabhaga (Sanskrit for "moon river"), changed to Bhagasasi and finally corrupted into its present form as Bekasi.

Tarumanagara kingdom also has become the name for Tarumanagara University, a private university based in Jakarta, established in 1959.

== See also ==
- History of Indonesia
- Sunda kingdom
- Galuh kingdom
- List of monarchs of Java

== Bibliography ==
- Edi S. Ekadjati, Kebudayaan Sunda Zaman Pajajaran, Jilid 2, Pustaka Jaya, 2005
- "Maharadja Cri Djajabhoepathi, Soenda’s Oudst Bekende Vorst", 1915, TBG, 57. Batavia: BGKW, page 201–219
