= Cisadane River =

River in West Java and Banten, Indonesia

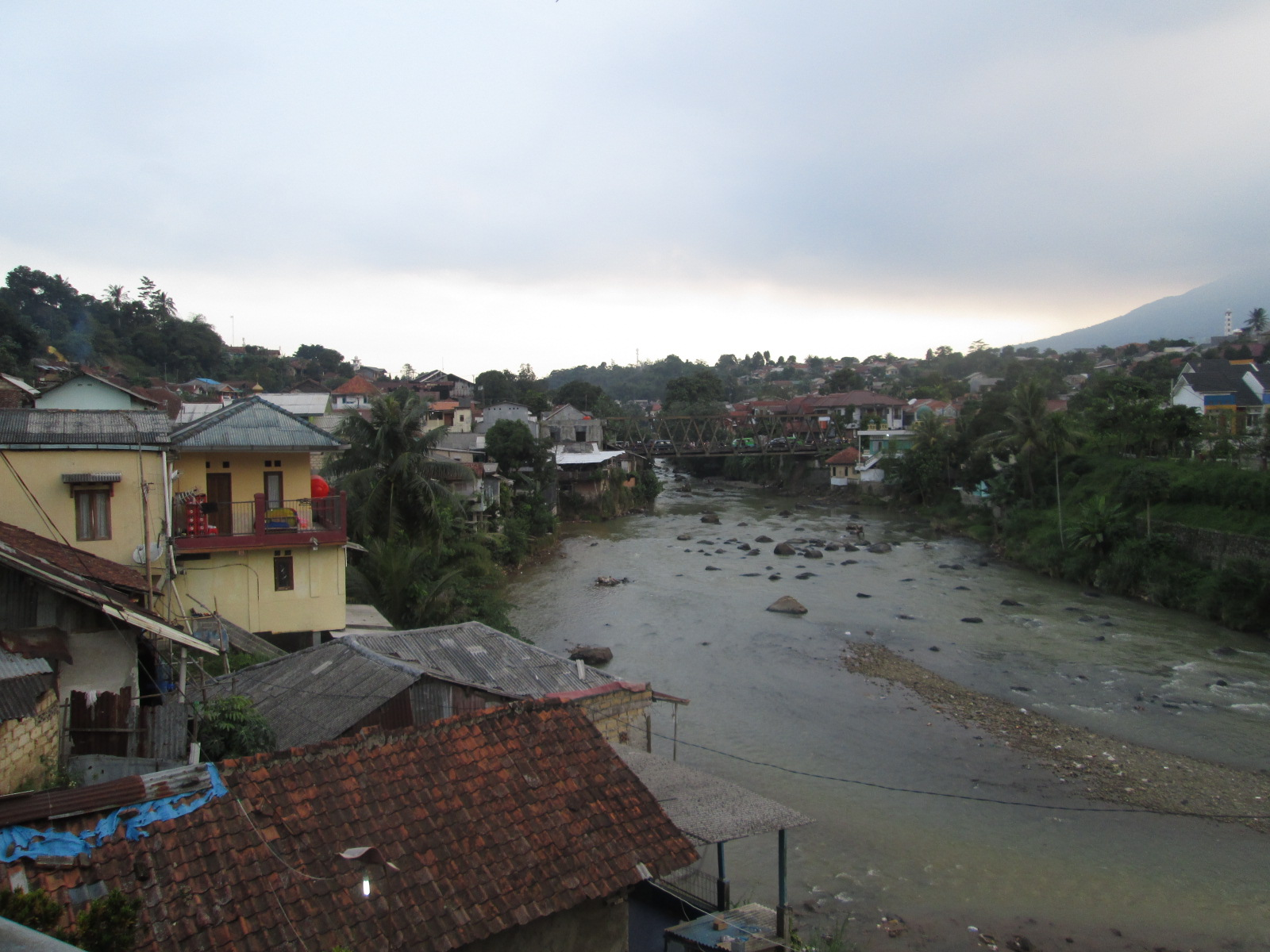
- Cisadane River near Batutulis Train Station

- Location in Java

Location
- Country: Indonesia
- Province: West Java; Banten

Physical characteristics
- Source: Mount Pangrango
- 2nd source: Mount Salak
- 3rd source: Nirmala valley
- Mouth: Java Sea
  - location: Teluk Naga
  - coordinates: 6°00′53″S 106°37′58″E
- Length: 137.6 km (85.5 mi)
- Basin size: 1,536 km^{2} (593 sq mi)

Basin features
- River system: Cisadane basin
- Landmarks: Soekarno-Hatta International Airport, Great Mosque Al-Ittihad (Tangerang)
- Tributaries
  - left: Cianten

The Cisadane River (Note: Note that the prefixed syllable "Ci" means river, so to avoid tautology the true translation is "Sadane River".) is a 138 kilometres (86 mi) long river in northern West Java, Indonesia. The river has its source at Mount Pangrango and passes through Bogor and Tangerang before flowing to the Java Sea.

The rivers in Banten, the westernmost province of Java, run roughly parallel to each other. The main ones are the Peteh, called the Banten on the lower reaches near the city of Kota Banten, the Ujung, which enters the sea at Pontang, the Durian, which enters the sea at Tanara, the Manceuri, and the Sadane.

The Ci Sadane rises in the mountainous region of Priyangan and 1682 formed the border between the Dutch East India Company (VOC) territory and Batavia (modern Jakarta).

The Durian, Manceuri, and Sadane rivers flow through the Tangerang Plain. In 1911 the colonial government started to prepare an irrigation plan, and in 1914 determined that various tracts in the plain should be subject to compulsory purchase for this purpose. In 1919 a plan was issued where the north of the plain would be irrigated by the Ci Sadane and the southern area by the Ci Durian.

Its tributaries include the Ci Anten and Ci Apus. The river has a watershed area of approximately 1,536 km^{2} (593 sq mi).

== See also ==
- List of drainage basins of Indonesia
- List of rivers of Java
- List of rivers of Indonesia

== Sources ==
- Kop, J. H.; Ravesteijn, W.; K. J., Kasper, eds. (2015), Irrigation Revisited: An Anthology of Indonesian–Dutch Cooperation, 1965–2014, Eburon Uitgeverij B.V., ISBN 978-94-6301-028-3
- Talens, Johan (1999), Een feodale samenleving in koloniaal vaarwater: Staatsvorming, koloniale expansie en economische onderontwikkeling in Banten, West Java (1600–1750) (in Dutch), Uitgeverij Verloren, ISBN 90-6550-067-7
