= Tugu inscription =

Tarumanagara inscription near Jakarta, Indonesia

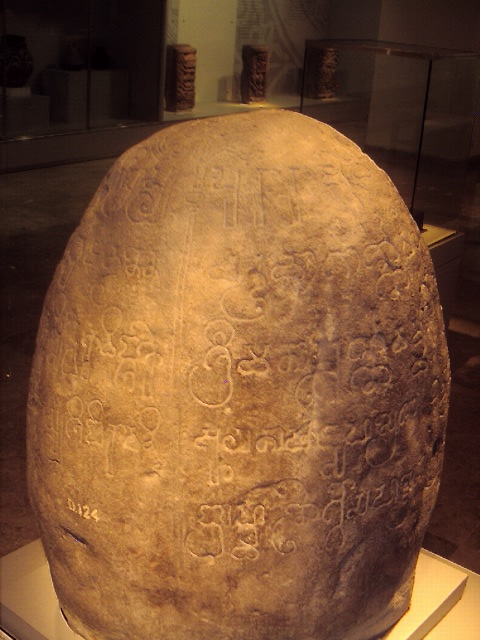
- Tugu inscription in National Museum of Indonesia
- Material: Stone
- Size: 1 metre
- Writing: Pallava script in Sanskrit
- Created: early 5th century
- Discovered: Batutumbuh hamlet, Tugu village, Koja, North Jakarta, Indonesia
- Present location: National Museum of Indonesia, Jakarta
- Registration: D.124

The Tugu inscription is one of the mid 5th century Tarumanagara inscriptions discovered in Batutumbuh hamlet, Tugu village, Koja, North Jakarta, in Indonesia. The sanskrit stone inscription of King Purnavarman is of special interest because it preserves the record of river-works executed in the middle of the fifth century. The inscription contains information about hydraulic projects; the irrigation and water drainage project of the Chandrabhaga river by the order of Rajadirajaguru, and also the water project of the Gomati river by the order of King Purnawarman in the 22nd year of his reign. The digging project to straighten and widen the river was conducted in order to avoid flooding in the wet season, and as an irrigation project during the dry season.

In 1911 by the initiative of P. de Roo de la Faille, the Tugu inscription was moved to Museum Bataviaasch genootschap van Kunsten en Wetenschappen (now National Museum of Indonesia) with inventory number D.124. The inscription was carved on a round egg-like stone measuring about 1 metre.

== Content ==
The Tugu inscription was written in Pallava script, arranged in the form of Sanskrit Sloka with Anustubh metrum, consisting of five lines that run around the surface of the stone. Just like other inscriptions from the Tarumanagara kingdom, the Tugu inscriptions do not mention the date of the edict. The date of the inscriptions was estimated and analyzed according to paleographic study which concluded that the inscriptions originated from the mid 5th century. The script of the Tugu inscription and the Cidanghyang inscription bear striking similarity, such as the script "citralaikha" written as "citralekha", leading to the assumption that the writer of these inscriptions was the same person.

The Tugu inscription is the longest Tarumanagara inscription pronounced by edict of Sri Maharaja Purnawarman. The inscription was made during the 22nd year of his reign, to commemorate the completion of the canals of the Gomati and Candrabhaga rivers. On the inscription there is an image of a staff crowned with Trisula straight to mark the separation between the beginning and the end of each sentence.

=== Transliterated text ===
purā rājādhirājena guruṇā pīna-bāhunā khātā khyātāṁ purīṁ prāpya
candrabhāgārṇṇavaṁ yayau // pravarddhamāna-dvāviṅśad-vatsara śrī-guṇaujasā narendra-dhvaja-bhātena
śrīmatā pūrṇṇavarmmaṇo // prārabhya phālguṇe māse khātā kr̥ṣṇāṣṭamī-tithau caitra-śukla-trayodaśyāM dinais siddhaikaviṅśakai[ḥ //]
Āyatā ṣaṭ-sahasreṇa dhanuṣā[ṁ] saśatena ca dvāviṅśena nadī ramyā gomatī nirmalodakā // pitāmahasya rājarṣer vvidāryya śibirāvani[M]
brāhmaṇair go-sahasrenā prayāti kr̥ta-dakṣiṇā

=== English translation ===
"Long ago, the river named Candrabhaga had been dug by a noble Maharaja that have strong and tight arms, Purnawarman, to channel (water) flow to the sea, after the canal flow by his famous royal palace. In the 22nd year of His Majesty King Purnawarman's throne (reign) that shines brightly because of his intelligence and wisdom and has become the royal flag (leader) of all kings (and now) he ordered to dig the river (canal) with beautiful clear water, (the canal) named Gomati, after the canal flow through the middle of the residence of the noble elder (King Purnawarman's grandfather). The project was started in a fortunate day, date 8 half (moon) dark of the citrā asterism of the Phālguna month, and (the project) only took 21 days, with the canal is 6122 bows long. The ceremony was performed by Brahmins with 1000 cows given as the gift."

== Bibliography ==
1. C.M. Pleyte, 1905/1906, "Uit Soenda’s Voortijd" Het Daghet: 176ff.
2. H. Kern, 1910, "Een woord in ‘Sanskrit opschrift van Toegoe verbeterd", TBG [Tijschrift voor Indische Taal-, Land- en Volkenkunde, uitgegeven door het Bataviaasch Genootschap van Kunsten en Wetenschappen] LII: 123.
3. N.J. Krom, 1914/1915, "Inventaris der Hindoe-oudheden", ROD [Rapporten van den Oudheidkundigen Dienst in Nederlandsch-Indië] no. 35: 19.
4. N.J. Krom, 1931, Hindoe-Javaansche Geschiedenis, ‘s-Gravenhage, Martinus Nijhof: 79-81.
5. J.Ph. Vogel, 1914, 1915, "The Earliest Sanskrit Inscriptions of Java" ROD: 28-35; plate 27.
6. F.D.K. Bosch, 1951, "Guru, Drietand en Bron", BKI [Bijdragen tot de taal-, land- en volkenkunde] 107 (2-3): 117-134. https://doi.org/10.1163/22134379-90002457. English translation, 1961, "Guru, Trident and Spring" in Selected Studies in Indonesian Archaeology, The Hague: Martinus Nijhof: 164ff.
7. J. Noorduyn and H.Th. Verstappen, 1972, "Purnavarman Riverworks Near Tugu" BKI 128 (2-3): 298-307.
8. L.Ch. Damais, 1955, "Les Ecritures d’Origine Indienne en Indonesie et dans le Sud-Est Asiatique Continental’, Société des études indochinoises (Saigon), BSEI [Bulletin de la Société des études indochinoises] XXX(40): 365-382.
