= History of Sundanese language =

The word "Sunda" in several scripts that have been used to write Sundanese

Sundanese language is a member of the Malayo-Polynesian language family which is part of the Austronesian language family, thus, Sundanese is one of the derivatives of Proto-Malayo-Polynesian reconstruction whose ancestor is Proto-Austronesian. The earliest evidence of the use of Sundanese in written form can be traced from the a collection of inscriptions found in the Kawali region, Ciamis which is thought to have been made in 14th century. Meanwhile, Sundanese in spoken form is believed by some to have been used long before the inscriptions were made.

In its history, Sundanese language has undergone several periodization or developments. The development of linguistics is in line with the development of Sundanese culture which has cultural contact with other cultures. Experts usually divide the periodization of the Sundanese language into two main stages, namely Old Sundanese and Modern Sundanese whose linguistic characteristics can be clearly distinguished. Meanwhile, according Hendayana (2020:217–218), The development of the Sundanese language can be divided into three periods, namely:

1. Old Sundanese (Buhun)
2. Classical Sundanese (Switch)
3. Modern Sundanese (Kiwari)

== Old Sundanese ==
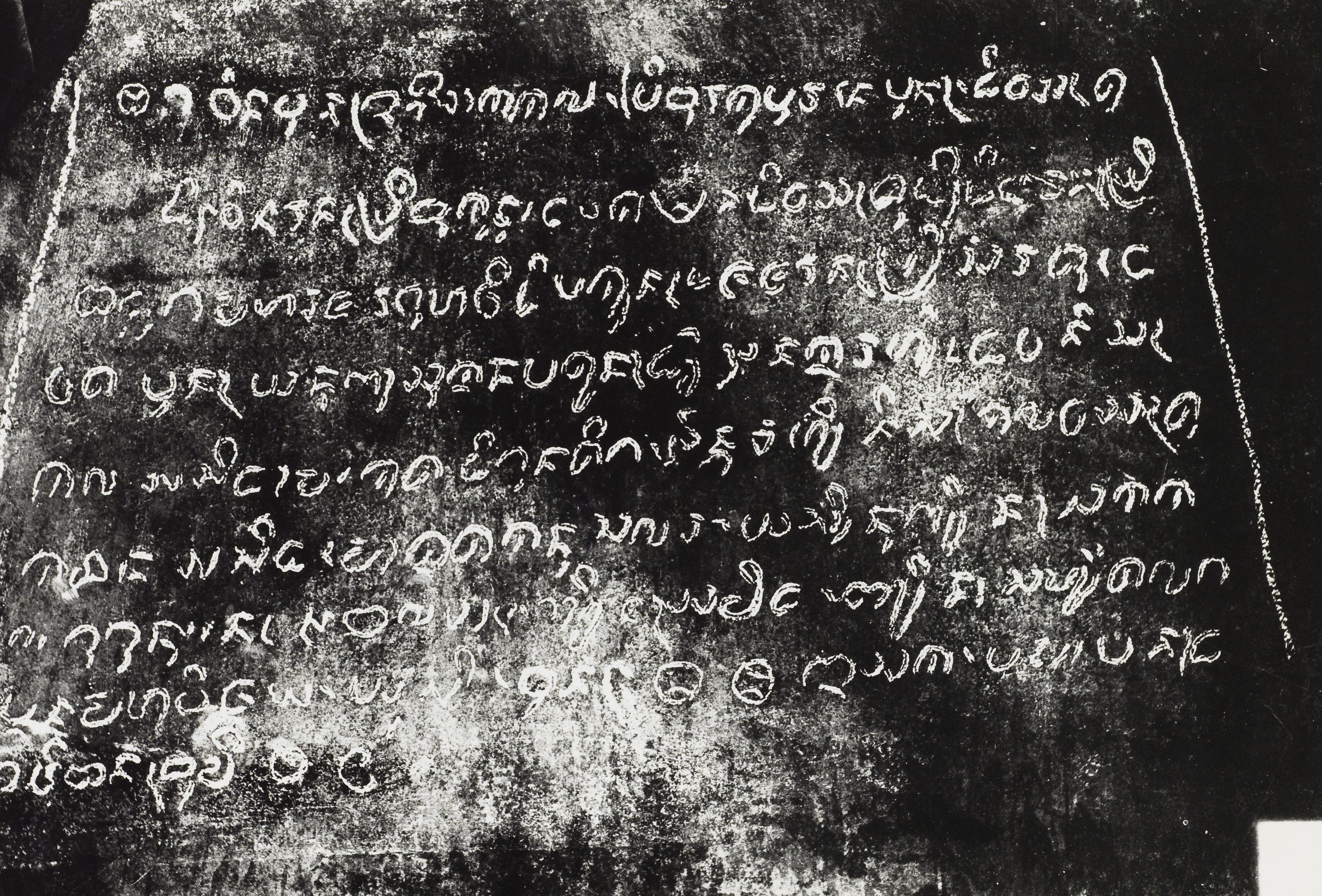
Batutulis inscription was made in 1533.

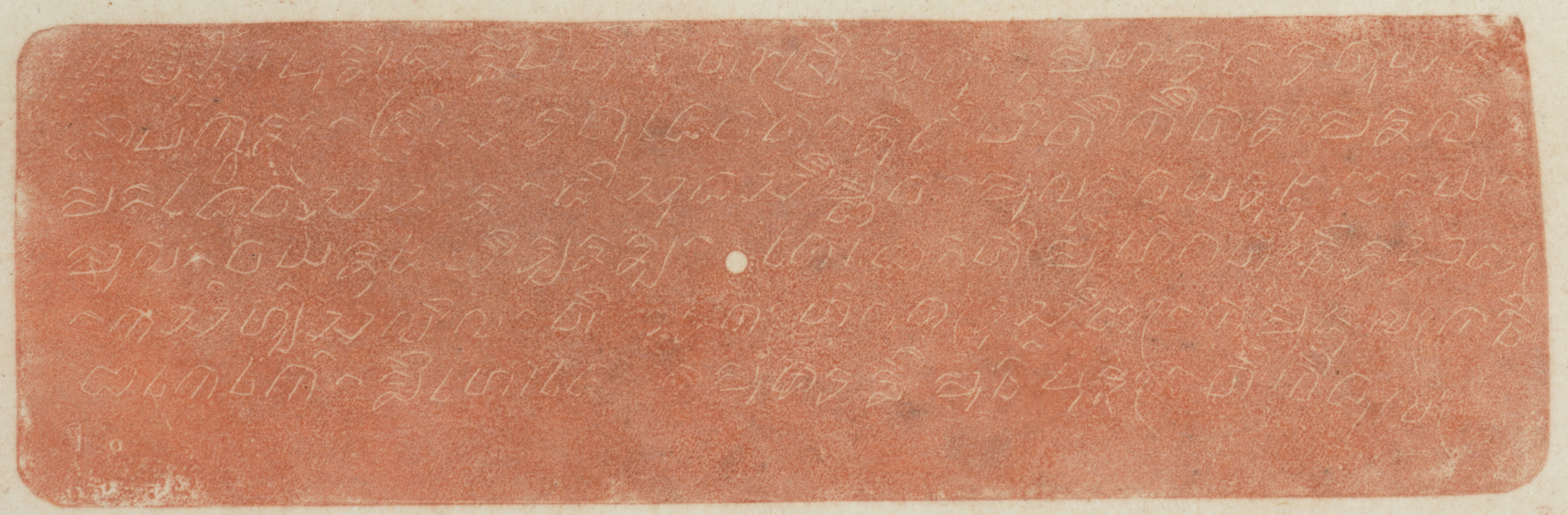
Kebantenan inscription.

Old Sundanese is the name given to the temporal dialect forms of Sundanese found in inscriptions and manuscripts made before 17th century. This language is generally believed to be the predecessor of the Sundanese language used in present day. Based on the level of syntax, morphology, and lexicon, Old Sundanese more or less shows a striking difference with Modern Sundanese. This language is commonly used in the Kingdom of Sunda in the pre-Islamic period which was written on manuscripts from various media, such as lontar leaf, corypha, and daluang paper. This language is used in various fields, such as religion, art, and government, and in daily communication.

Old Sundanese is mostly written using Old Sundanese script and Buda script, In addition, several Old Sundanese manuscripts are also written using Kawi script. Examples of manuscripts that use the Old Sundanese language include:

1. Carita Parahyangan
2. Sewaka Darma
3. Sanghyang Siksa Kandang Karesian

=== Examples of Old Sundanese fragments ===
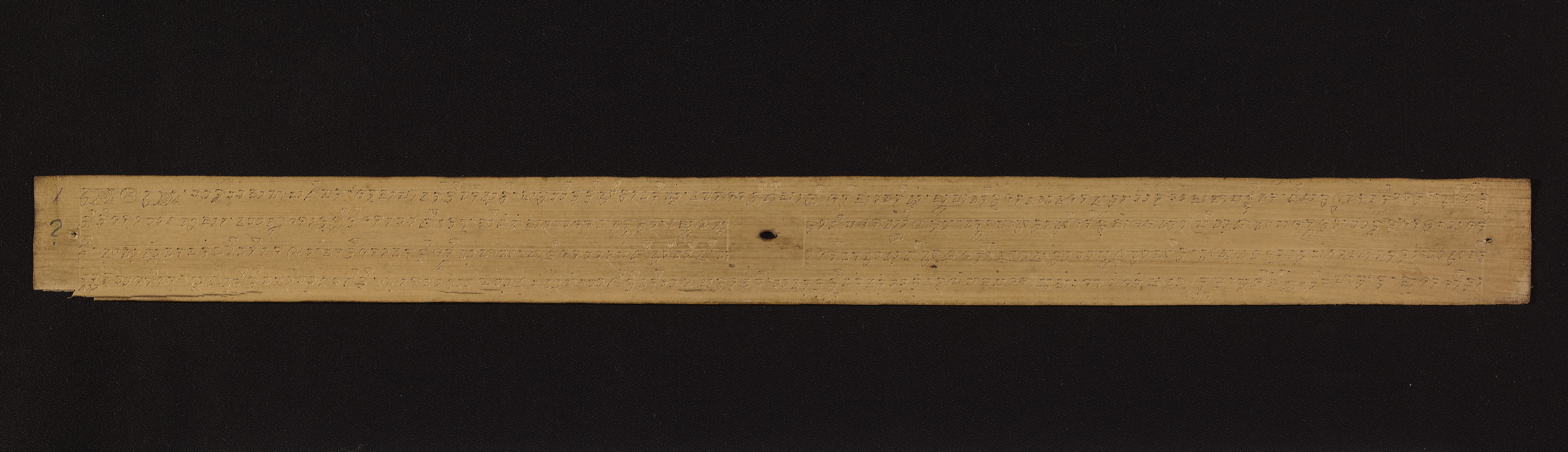
Bujangga Manik manuscript (1400).

Excerpts from the manuscript Bujangga Manik, written around the 14th century to the 15th century.

Note: The transliterated and translated texts presented below are taken with some necessary changes from the book Tiga Pesona Sunda Kuna (2006) which is a translation of the book Three Old Sundanese Poems by J. Noorduyn & A. Teeuw.

==== Transliteration ====
Saur sang mahapandita: 'Kumaha girita ini? Mana sinarieun teuing teka ceudeum ceukreum teuing? Mo ha(n)teu nu kabé(ng)kéngan.' Saur sang mahapandita: 'Di mana éta geusanna? Eu(n)deur nu ceurik sadalem, séok nu ceurik sajero, midangdam sakadatuan.' Mo lain di Pakanycilan, tohaan eukeur nu ma(ng)kat, P(e)rebu Jaya Pakuan. Saurna karah sakini: 'A(m)buing tatanghi ti(ng)gal, tarik-tarik dibuhaya, pawekas pajeueung beungeut, kita a(m)bu deung awaking, héngan sapoé ayeuna. Aing dék leu(m)pang ka wétan.' Saa(ng)geus nyaur sakitu, i(n)dit birit su(n)dah diri, lugay sila su(n)dah leu(m)pang. Sadiri ti salu panti, saturun ti tungtung surung, Ulang panapak ka lemah, kalangkang ngabiantara, reujeung deung dayeuhanana, Mukakeun panto kowari.

==== Translation ====
The mahapandita said: 'Why is this shocking? Not as usual until the cloud is gloomy? Maybe they are confused.' A mahapandita asked: Where did it happen? A weeping roar fills the palace, many are crying inside, all the contents of the kingdom are lamenting. Maybe in Pakancilan, for the departure of the Prince, Prabu Jaya Pakuan.' He said thus: Mother, look clearly, deeply, for the last one face to face, you, mother, with me, only one day left, Ananda is going to the East.' After saying that, crouched down and stood up, walked and left. On his way from the assembly hall, descended from the end of the pulpit, then stepped his feet to the ground, his shadow cast into the sky, together with himself, then opened the gate.

== Classical Sundanese ==
Classical Sundanese is a transitional language that bridges Old Sundanese with Modern Sundanese. This language is a further development of the Old Sundanese language after the collapse of Sunda Kingdom in 1579. The collapse of the Sunda Kingdom coincided with the strengthening of the influence of Islam which penetrated into the territory of the Sundanese. Classical Sundanese vocabulary was strongly influenced by Arabic, then Malay, and the emergence of language level which was adopted from the monarchical culture of an Islamic style. This language was used in the 17th century until the mid-19th century, especially in the fields of religion and government.

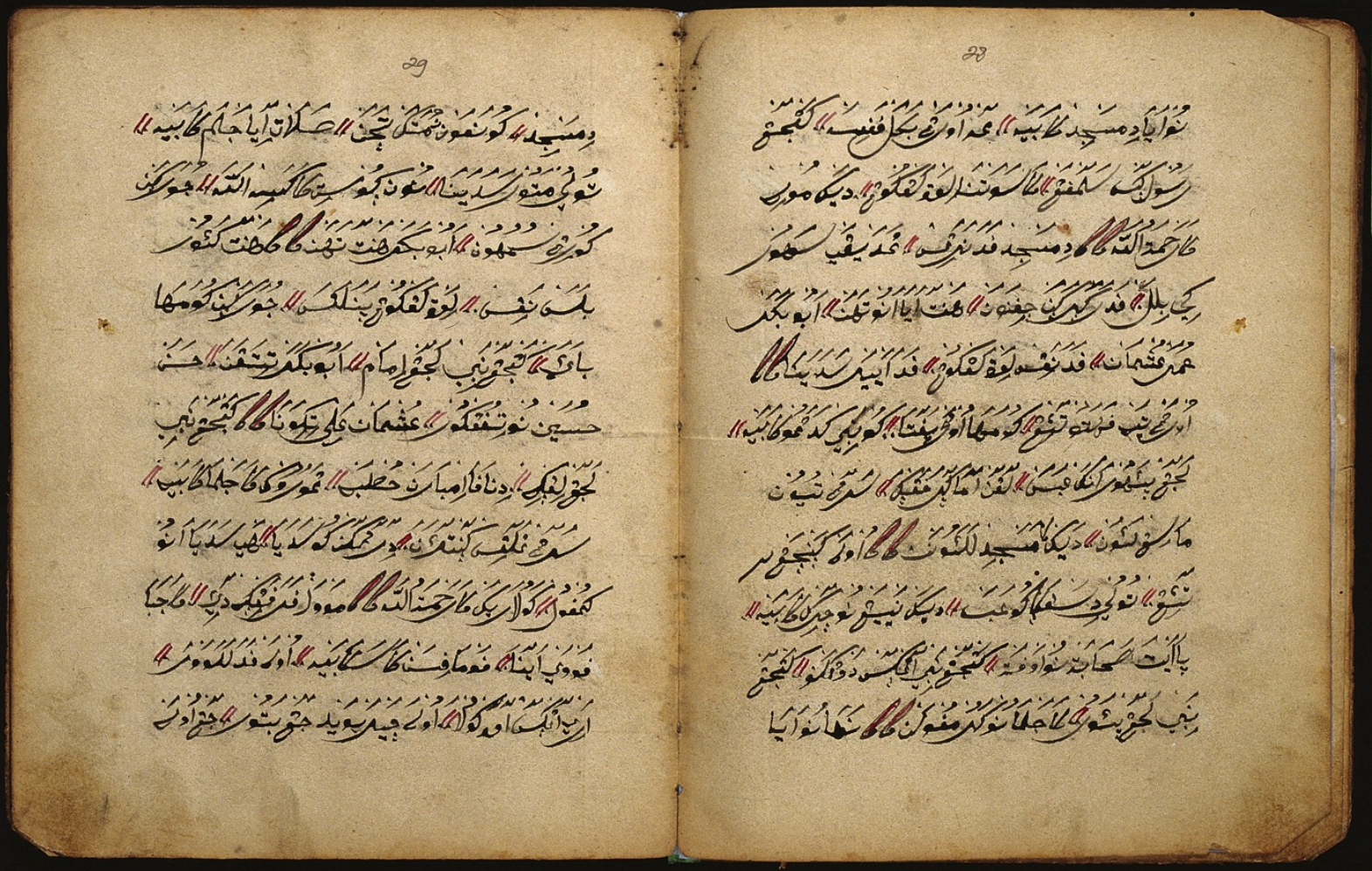
The manuscript of Wawacan Nabi Paras which was written using Pegon alphabet.

The classical Sundanese writing system initially used Old Sundanese script with a form model commonly found in manuscripts, but over time, the writing system of Classical Sundanese began to adopt foreign scripts such as Pegon from Arabic alphabet, Cacarakan from Hanacaraka, and Latin alphabet adapted to Sundanese phonology. Manuscripts written in Cacarakan are in the form of poetry of the type guguritan and wawacan, i.e. poetry composed in the form of dangding or song, has rules gurulagu, guruwilangan, and gurugatra in every pada 'bait' and padalisan 'baris'. Meanwhile, manuscripts in the Pegon alphabet are heavily influenced by Arabic and Malay and are written in the form of verse or pupujian poetry.

One example of Classical Sundanese script is the script Carita Waruga Guru which was written in the 18th century using Old Sundanese script. In addition to these manuscripts, several examples of manuscripts that use Classical Sundanese include:

1. Sajarah Cikundul
2. Sajarah Galuh Bareng Galunggung
3. Carios Samaun

=== Example of Classical Sundanese fragment ===
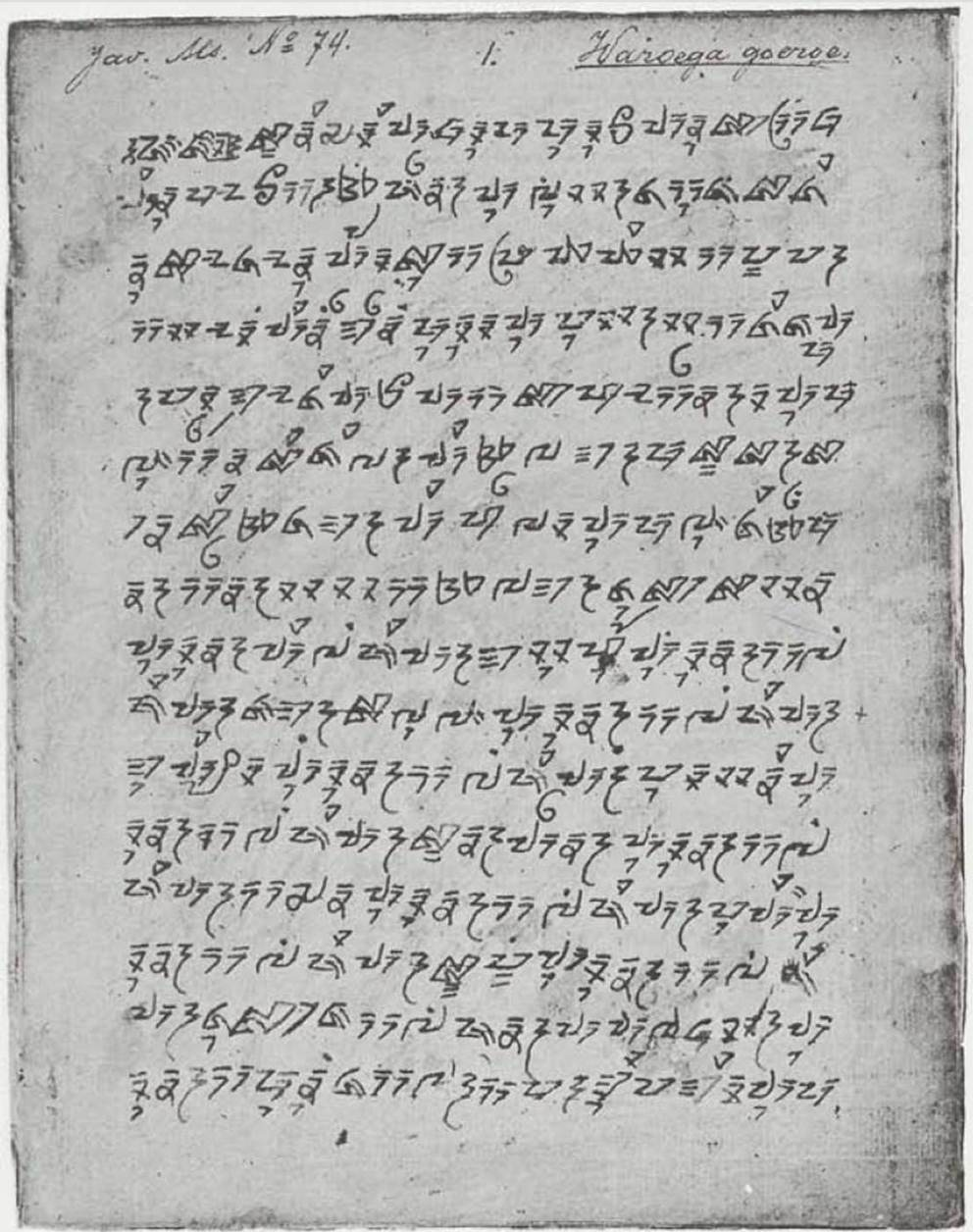
Facsimile edition of Carita Waruga Guru manuscript. (1700s)

Excerpt from the manuscript Carita Waruga Guru which is thought to have been written in the 1750s.

Note: The full transliteration text can be found in Wikisource on file Poesaka Soenda 1923-03-1(09).pdf pages 130–136, the translation is adapted from the Dutch translation in file Tijdschrift voor Indische Taal- Land- en Volkenkunde, LV.pdf halaman 380–382.

==== Transliteration ====
Ini carita Waruga Guru, éta nu nyakrawati. Nu poék angen tulus, da kujaba di nu bodo, nu tarrabuka priyayi sakarep kasorang tineung meunang guru. Ratu Pusaka di jagat paramodita, éta, kanyahokeun ratu galuh, keurna bijil ti alam gaib; nya Nabi Adam ti heula. Ratu Galuh dienggonkeun sasaka alam dunya. Basana turun ti langit masuhur, turun ka langit jambalulah, turun ka langit mutiyara, turun ka langit purasani, turun ka langit inten, turun ka langit kancana, turun ka langit putih, turun ka langit ireng, turun ka langit dunya. Ja kalangan, tata lawas turun ka Gunung Jabalkap. Upami: ratu Galuh dienggonkeun sasaka alam dunya, nabi Adam ti heula, pinareking gunung Mesir. Adam diseuweu opat puluh, dwa nu sakembaran, munijah luluhur haji dewi; cikal, da hiji dingarankeun nabi Isis, luluhur manusa.

==== Free translation ====
This is the story of Waruga Guru, who rules the world. He whose mind is dark will remain so, for ignorance is absolutely without exception, Enlightened youths, seeing what they want fulfilled, get it from the teacher. The prince in the image of fear, let it be known, Ratu Galuh, since he emerged from the unseen realm, indeed Prophet Adam preceded (him). Queen Galuh is made an earthly heirloom. Then he descended from the famous sky, descended into the sky "Jambalullah" (God's glory), down to the pearly sky, down to the steel sky, down to the diamond sky, down to the golden sky, down to the white sky, down to the black sky, down to the sky of the world (human world). Because something was in the way, he then descended in time to Mount Jabalkap. The parable: Queen Galuh is made a world heritage, Prophet Adam preceded (him) near Mount Egypt. Adam had forty children, twins of both sexes, (permitted) to become the ancestor of princes and queens: the eldest, king, called the prophet Isis: he was the ancestor of man.

== Modern Sundanese ==
Modern Sundanese is a form of Sundanese language that developed during the Dutch colonialism in Indonesia, This language was developed and codified marked by the publication of dictionaries discussing the Sundanese language. The long journey of the development of the Modern Sundanese language can be described through the events below:

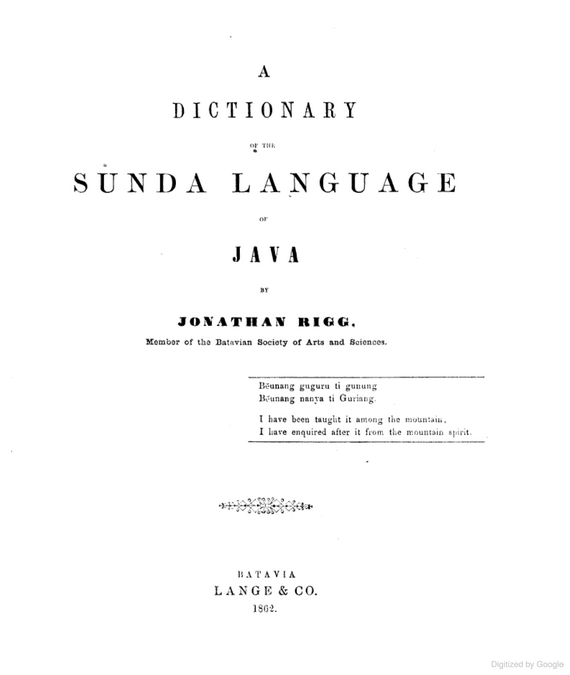
Cover of Sundanese-English dictionary

1. 1841: The Dutch-Malay and Sundanese Dictionary was published based on the vocabulary lists compiled by De Wilde, written by Roorda in Amsterdam. This event marked the recognition of Sundanese as an officially independent language.
2. 1842: Walter Robert van Hoëvell, a pastor serving in Batavia wrote a journal on the ethnographic terms Djalma Soenda.
3. 1843: A competition for compiling a Sundanese dictionary with the most entries was held which was initiated by Pieter Mijer, a secretary of the Batavian Society for Arts and Sciences who was awarded 1000 Gulden and gold medal. This became a trigger for Europeans to learn Sundanese.
4. 1862: For the first time, a Sundanese-English dictionary was published by Jonathan Rigg, a British businessman who owns a plantation in South Bogor. The publication of this Sundanese-English dictionary made some Dutch people disappointed, one of them is Koorders, a doctor theology and law assigned to Dutch East Indies in 1862 to establish a teacher's school (Kweekschool). "This makes me sad because the composer is not Dutch", said Koorders (1863).
5. 1872: The choice of the form of Sundanese spoken in Bandung as the purest Sundanese according to the Dutch colonial government, This language form was then standardized to become Standard Sundanese with the publication of Sundanese dictionaries and grammar books by scholars and evangelists. Year 1912, reaffirmed that the Bandung dialect is the standard Sundanese language. This determination is still in effect today.

Since then, the Sundanese language has continued to develop, Sundanese literature has begun to be developed and Sundanese has become the language of instruction in schools basic and advanced levels, this is supported by the publication of books or other reading materials in Sundanese which was pioneered by Raden Muhammad Musa, a great ruler of Limbangan, Garut who was also encouraged by Karel Frederik Holle, a Dutch national who pays great attention to language and Sundanese culture. Land's Drukkerij and Volk-slectuur (1908) which changed its name to Balai Poestaka in 1917 played an important role in the publication of these Sundanese books. Then, there emerged authors who wrote their works in Sundanese, such as Adiwijaya, Kartawinata, Burhan Kartadireja, M. Kartadimaja, R. Rangga Danukusumah, R. Suriadiraja, R. Ayu Lasminingrat, D.K. Ardiwinata, and until now there are still many generations of successors emerging.

The Modern Sundanese writing system uses the Latin alphabet with several different spellings, In addition, in limited use, Modern Sundanese can also be written using Pegon and Cacarakan. This situation continued until 1997, a workshop was held at Padjadjaran University to define standard Sundanese script whose form model is based on ancient Sundanese script with some simplifications, This script was later designated as one of the modern (contemporary) Sundanese writing systems taught in schools.

Literary works in Modern Sundanese have many titles, some of which are literary works in the form of poetry (Sundanese: Sajak) collected by Ajip Rosidi in his book entitled Puisi Sunda Modern dalam Dua Bahasa (2001).

=== Examples of Modern Sundanese fragments ===
Poetry by Surachman R.M. (birth on 1936) entitled Basa Ngurebkeun which was later translated by Ajip Rosidi into Di Kuburan.

==== Text ====
Basa milu ngurebkeun, harita

patepung reujeung manéhna

Teu sangka

Paromanna geus lalayu sekar

lir potrét panineungan

boléas kawas warna kabayana

"Ceuceu mah geus incuan. Kuma

Ayi sabaraha batina?"

Dijawab ku imut, semu katahan

Sab mangsa 20 taunan téh kapan

keur usum urang mah lain lumayan

Basa ngurebkeun geus lekasan

pok deui manéhna lalaunan

"Kulan?" cék kuring panasaran

"Muhun moal kasorang deui

Mangsa rumaja mah, Yi

moal kasorang deui..."

==== Translation ====
Time to attend the cemetery

meet him

I didn't expect it

His face is like a withered flower

like a portrait of memories

the color of the kebaya

"I already have grandchildren. And you

How many children do you have?"

I answered with a smile, as if restrained

Because 20 years

not good for us

Burial time over

slowly he said again

"What?" I asked curious

"Yes, it won't happen again

beautiful teenage years

will never happen again..."
