= Lasminingrat =

Sundanese author and scholar (1854–1948)

Raden Ayu Lasminingrat
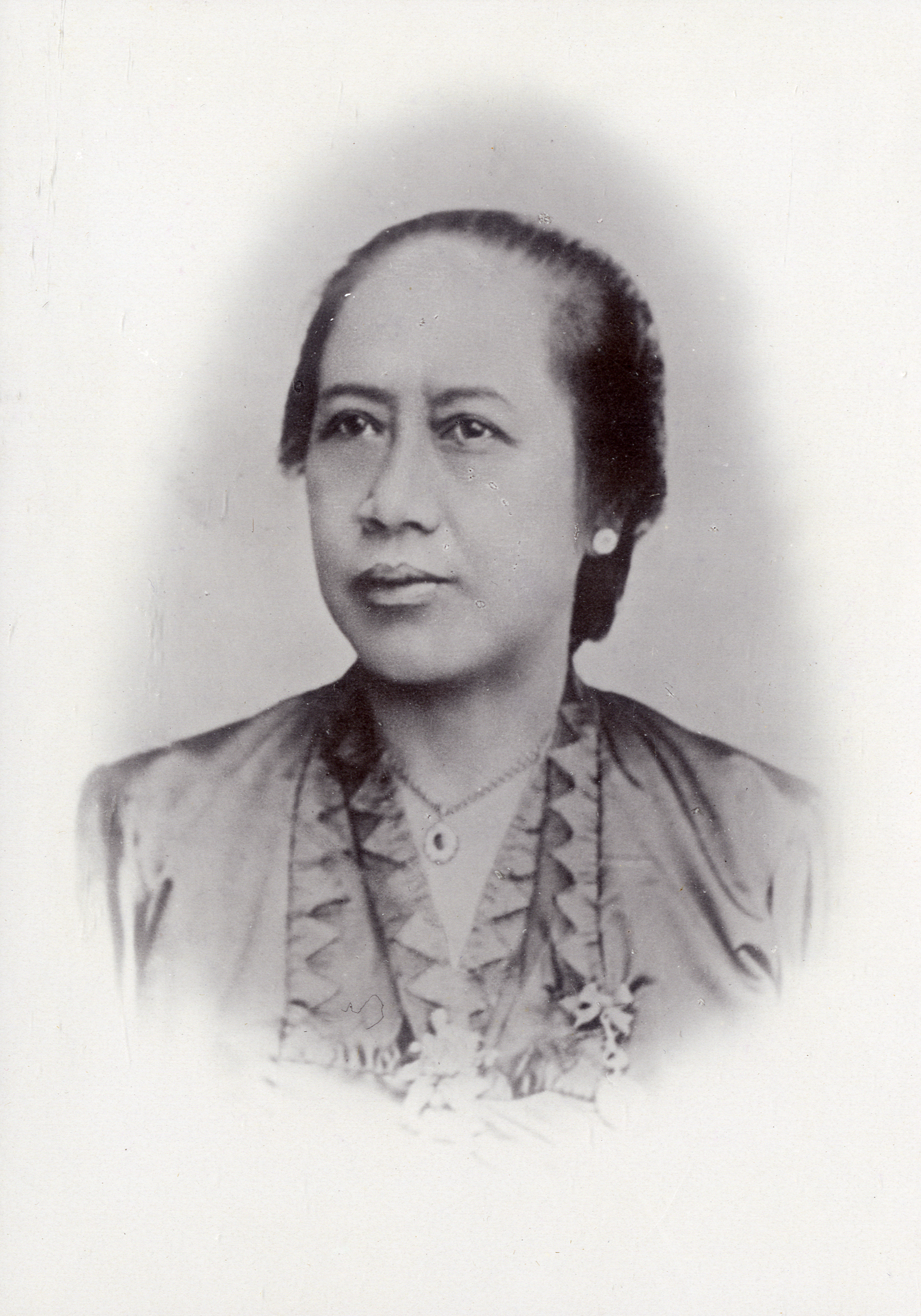
- Born: Lasminingrat; 29 March 1854; Garut, Dutch East Indies
- Died: April 10, 1948 (aged 94); Garut, Indonesia
- Other names: Raden Ayu Lasminingrat
- Occupation: Scholar
- Spouse(s): Raden Tamtu; Raden Adipati Aria Wiratanudatar VII
- Children: Raden Ayu Mojaningrat
- Parents: Raden Haji Muhamad Musa (father); Raden Ayu Ria (mother)

Raden Ayu Lasminingrat (Sundanese: ᮛ᮪ᮓ᮪. ᮃᮚᮥ ᮜᮞ᮪ᮙᮤᮔᮤᮀᮛᮒ᮪; 29 March 1854 – 10 April 1948) was a Sundanese author and scholar. She was the first Garut woman who spoke Dutch fluently.

== Early life and career ==
Raden Ayu Lasminingrat was born in Garut in what was then the Dutch East Indies on 29 March 1854. She is the eldest daughter of Raden Haji Muhamad Musa and Raden Ayu Ria, a Sundanese prince, and writer. During her childhood, she stayed with Levyson Norman in Sumedang who was Raden Haji Muhamad Musa's colleague. When she lived with Norman, she was called Saatje and learned reading, writing, Dutch, and other knowledge that related to womanhood.

In 1871, she returned to Garut and worked as a book translator. In 1875, she released a book Carita Erman, in which she translated Christoph von Schmid works. One year later, she authored a book Wanasari atawa roepa-roepa Dongeng Jilid I in which she translated Vertelsels uit het wonderland voor kinderen, klein en groot and other European children's fairytales.

== Establishing school ==
In 1907, she founded a women's school, Sakola Kautamaan Istri (Women's Proficiency School). The school received support from Garut Regent, R.A.A Wiratanudatara VIII, and colonial government officials. In the beginning, she faced difficulty in finding students because of local custom that women should not receive education at school. She first recruited students from her relatives and civil servant daughters to solve this problem.

She taught the students reading, writing, and women's skills such as sewing, embroidering, and knitting. In 1913, the school received permission from the colonial government. With government permission, the school grew.

== Personal life and death ==
She married R.A.A Wiratanudatara VIII. Lasminingrat died on 10 April 1948 in Garut.

== Award and legacy ==
Throughout her literary career, she has made a significant contribution to Sundanese literature and, as a result, to society at large. She also worked on the emancipation of women and the empowerment of women. In Indonesia, her school has expanded.

She earned the nickname "Indonesia’s First Literacy Mother". The government has proposed the name RA Lasminingrat as a National Hero of Indonesia.
