= Sundanese language =

Language spoken in Indonesia

Sundanese
- Basa Sunda ᮘᮞ ᮞᮥᮔ᮪ᮓ بَاسَا سُوْندَا
- Sunda in Sundanese script
- Pronunciation: [basa sʊnda] (standard) [basa suna] (dialectal)
- Native to: Indonesia
- Region: Western part of Java and surrounding areas
- Ethnicity: Sundanese; (Bantenese; Baduy; Ciptagelar); Cirebonese; Benteng Chinese
- Native speakers: 32 million (2015)
- Language family: Austronesian: Malayo-Polynesian; Malayo-Sumbawan (?); Sundanese
- Early forms: Proto-Austronesian: Proto-Malayo-Polynesian; Old Sundanese; Classical Sundanese
- Standard forms: Priangan Sundanese
- Dialects: Sundanese dialects
- Writing system: Latin script (Sundanese Latin alphabet) (present); Sundanese script (present; optional); Sundanese Pégon script (17–20th centuries AD, present; mostly on religious schools); Old Sundanese script (14–18th centuries AD, present; optional); Sundanese Cacarakan script (17–19th centuries AD, present; certain areas); Buda script (13–15th centuries AD, present; optional); Kawi script (historical); Pallava (historical); Pranagari (historical); Vatteluttu (historical)

Official status
- Regulated by: Badan Pengembangan dan Pembinaan Bahasa Lembaga Basa jeung Sastra Sunda

Language codes
- ISO 639-1: su
- ISO 639-2: sun
- ISO 639-3: Variously: sun – Sundanese bac – Baduy Sundanese osn – Old Sundanese
- Glottolog: sund1252
- Linguasphere: 31-MFN-a
- Areas where Sundanese is a majority native language Areas where Sundanese is a minority language with >100,000 speakers Areas where Sundanese is a minority language with <100,000 speakers

- Areas where Sundanese is the native and majority language Areas where Sundanese is a minority language Sundanese diaspora community that speaks Sundanese partially

A Sundanese speaker, recorded in Indonesia

Sundanese (/ˌsʌndəˈniːz/ SUN-də-NEEZ; endonym: Basa Sunda, Sundanese script: ᮘᮞ ᮞᮥᮔ᮪ᮓ, Pegon script: بَاسَا سُوْندَا, pronounced [basa sʊnda]) is an Austronesian language spoken in Java, primarily by the Sundanese. It has approximately 32 million native speakers in the western third of Java; they represent about 15% of Indonesia's total population.

== Classification ==
According to American linguist Robert Blust, Sundanese is closely related to the Malayic languages, as well as to language groups spoken in Borneo such as the Land Dayak languages or the Kayan–Murik languages, based on high lexical similarities between these languages.

== History and distribution ==
Sundanese is mainly spoken on the west side of the island of Java, in an area known as Tatar Sunda (Pasundan). However, Sundanese is also spoken in the western part of Central Java, especially in Brebes and Cilacap Regency, because these areas were previously under the control of the Galuh Kingdom. Many place names in Cilacap are still Sundanese names such as Dayeuhluhur, Cimanggu, Cipari, even as far as Banyumas, such as Cilongok, Cingebul, Gumelar, and others.

Until 1600 AD, Sundanese was the state language in the kingdoms of Salakanagara, Tarumanagara, Sunda, Galuh, Pajajaran, and Sumedang Larang. During this period, Sundanese was heavily influenced by the Sanskrit language as seen in the Ciaruteun inscription written at the time of King Purnawarman, using the Pallava script. Sundanese at that time was used in the fields of state, art, and daily life, many religious books were written in Sundanese and used Old Sundanese script such as the Sanghyang Siksa Kandang Karesian Manuscript, Carita Parahyangan, Amanat Galunggung, and Guru Talapakan.

In addition, according to some Sundanese language experts until around the 6th century, the area of speech reached around the Dieng Plateau in Central Java, based on the name "Dieng" which is considered the name Sundanese (from the origin of the word dihyang which is an Old Sundanese word). Along with transmigration and immigration carried out by the Sundanese ethnics, speakers of this language have spread beyond the island of Java. For example, in Lampung, South Sumatra, Bengkulu, Riau, West Kalimantan, Southeast Sulawesi, and even outside the country of Indonesia, such as Taiwan, Japan, Australia, and other countries, a significant number of ethnic Sundanese live in areas outside the Pasundan.

== Dialects ==
Sundanese has several dialects, conventionally described according to the locations of the people:

Linguistic map of Sundanese dialects in Western Java

- Baduy dialect, spoken by Baduy people in Lebak, but it is often considered as separate language.
- Western dialect, spoken in the provinces of Banten, the western part of Bogor Regency (especially in Greater Jasinga area), and some parts of Lampung.
- Northern dialect, spoken in Bogor Regency, and northwestern coastal areas of West Java.
- Southern or Priangan dialect, spoken in Sukabumi, Sumedang, Cianjur, Bandung, Garut, and Tasikmalaya.
- Mid-east dialect, spoken in Cirebon, Majalengka, and southern part of Indramayu.
- Northeast dialect, spoken in Kuningan (West Java) and Brebes (Central Java).
- Southeast dialect, spoken in Ciamis, Pangandaran, Banjar, and Cilacap (Central Java).

The Priangan dialect, which covers the largest area where Sundanese people lives (Parahyangan in Sundanese), is the most widely spoken type of Sundanese language, taught in elementary till senior-high schools (equivalent to twelfth-year school grade) in West Java and Banten Province.

== Writing system ==
The word "Sunda" in several scripts that have been used to write Sundanese

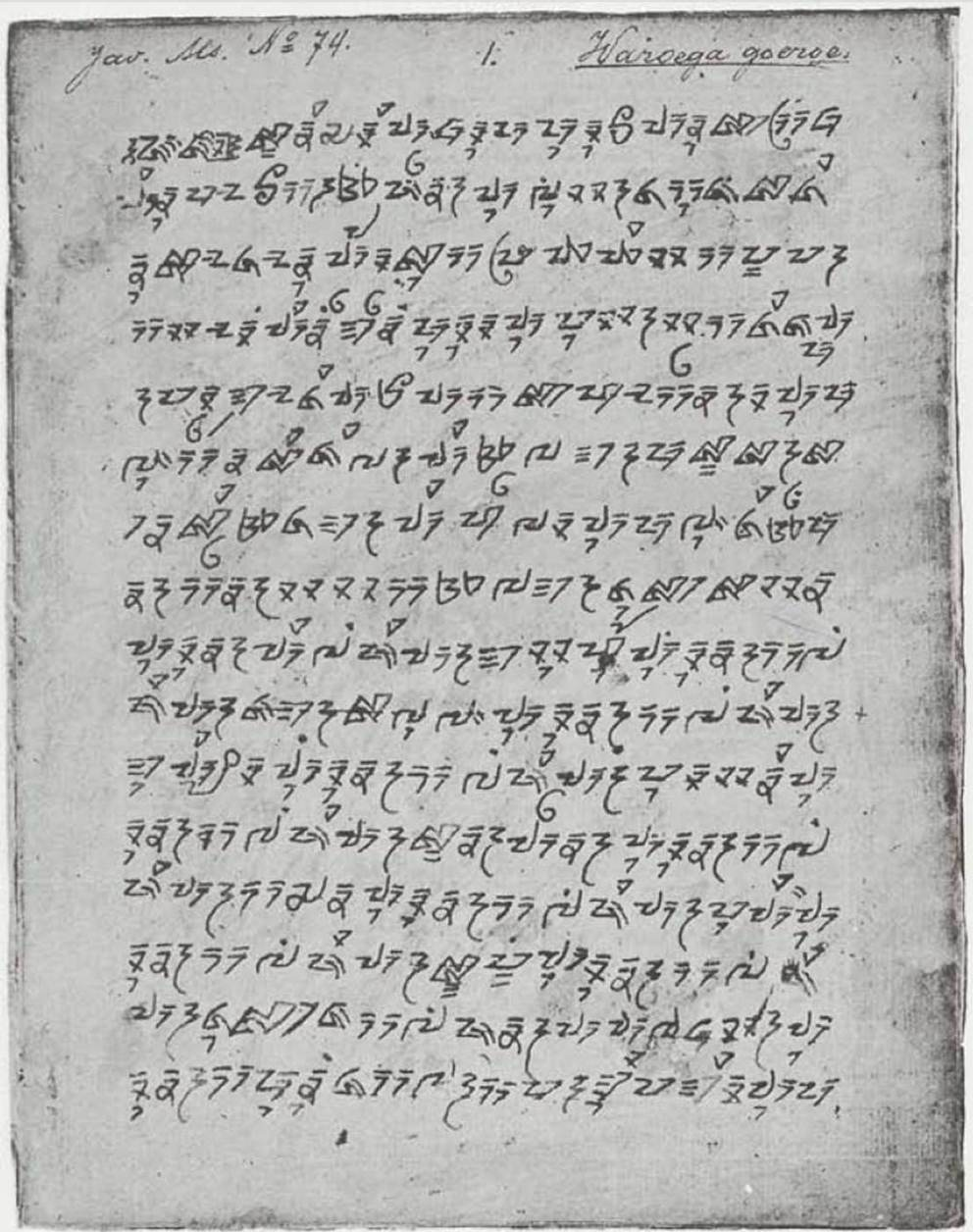
The first page from manuscript of Carita Waruga Guru which use the Old Sundanese script and the Old Sundanese language

The language has been written in different writing systems throughout history. The earliest attested documents of the Sundanese language were written in the Old Sundanese script (Aksara Sunda Kuno). After the arrival of Islam, the Pegon script is also used, usually for religious purposes. The Latin script then began to be used after the arrival of Europeans. In modern times, most of Sundanese literature is written in Latin script. Meanwhile, the regional governments of West Java and Banten have been actively promoting the use of Standard Sundanese script (Aksara Sunda Baku) in public places and on road signs. Although Pegon script is now mostly used in pesantrens (Islamic boarding schools) and Sundanese Islamic literature, it can still occasionally be seen in public places and on road signs in certain areas, such as Lembang and Tasikmalaya.

=== Latin alphabet ===
Letter (Capital)	A	B	C	D	É	E	Eu	F	G	H	I	J	K	L	M	N	O	P	Q	R	S	T	U	V	W	X	Y	Z
Letter (Non-capital)	a	b	c	d	é	e	eu	f	g	h	i	j	k	l	m	n	o	p	q	r	s	t	u	v	w	x	y	z
IPA phoneme	a	b	tʃ	d	e, ɛ	ə	ɤ	f	g	h	i	dʒ	k	l	m	n	o	p	k	r	s	t	u	v~f	w	ks	j	z

Below is a comparison table of letter usage between previous Sundanese spellings and the current spelling.

Letter	Pronunciation	Ardiwinata (1912–1947)	Surawidjaja (1947–1959)	LBBS (1959)	EBSYD (1972–1987)	EBS (1988–present)
A	a	A / a	A / a	A / a	A / a	A / a
B	b (bé)	B / b	B / b	B / b	B / b	B / b
C	c (cé)	Tj / tj	Tj / tj	C / c	C / c	C / c
D	d (dé)	D / d	D / d	D / d	D / d	D / d
E (é)	e, ɛ	E / e	É / é	É / é	E / e	É / é
E (pepet)	ə	E / e (no distinction)	Ĕ / ĕ	E / e	Ě / ě	E / e
Eu	ɤ (eu)	Eu / eu	Eu / eu	Eu / eu	Ö / ö	Eu / eu
F	f (éf)	F / f	F / f	F / f	F / f	F / f
G	ɡ (gé)	G / g	G / g	G / g	G / g	G / g
H	h (ha)	H / h	H / h	H / h	H / h	H / h
I	i	I / i	I / i	I / i	I / i	I / i
J	j (jé)	Dj / dj	Dj / dj	J / j	J / j	J / j
K	k (ka)	K / k	K / k	K / k	K / k	K / k
L	l (él)	L / l	L / l	L / l	L / l	L / l
M	m (ém)	M / m	M / m	M / m	M / m	M / m
N	n (én)	N / n	N / n	N / n	N / n	N / n
O	o	O / o	O / o	O / o	O / o	O / o
P	p (pé)	P / p	P / p	P / p	P / p	P / p
Q	q (ki)	Q / q	Q / q	Q / q	Q / q	Q / q
R	r (ér)	R / r	R / r	R / r	R / r	R / r
S	s (és)	S / s	S / s	S / s	S / s	S / s
T	t (té)	T / t	T / t	T / t	T / t	T / t
U	u	Oe / oe	U / u	U / u	U / u	U / u
V	v (vé)	V / v	V / v	V / v	V / v	V / v
W	w (wé)	W / w	W / w	W / w	W / w	W / w
X	x (éks)	X / x	X / x	X / x	X / x	X / x
Y	y (yé)	J / j	J / j	Y / y	Y / y	Y / y
Z	z (zét)	Z / z	Z / z	Z / z	Z / z	Z / z

== Phonology ==
=== Vowels ===
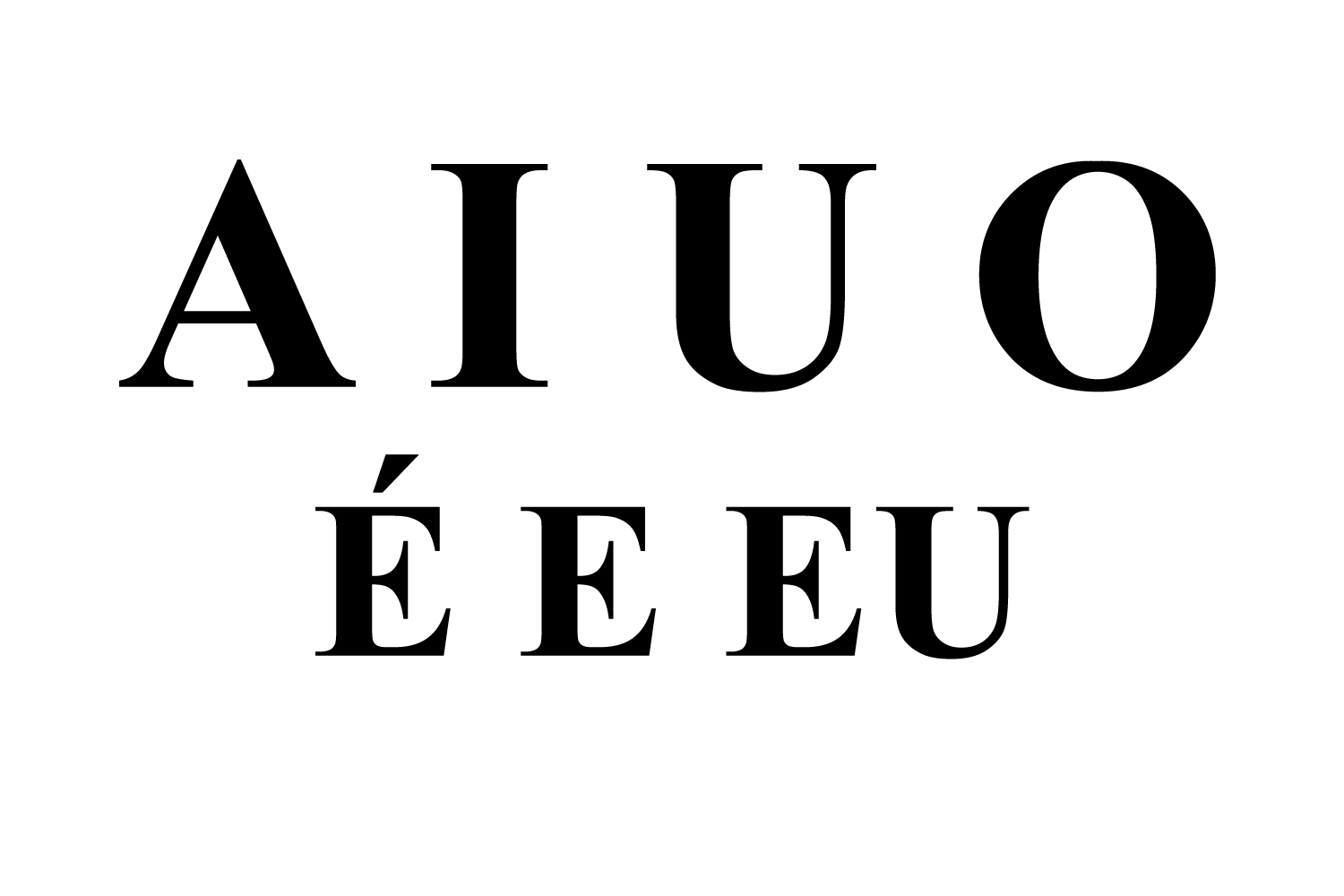
Vowels in Sundanese

There are seven vowels: a /a/, é /ɛ/, i /i/, o /ɔ/, u /u/, e /ə/, and eu /ɨ/.

	Front	Central	Back
Close	i	ɨ	u
Mid	ɛ	ə	ɔ
Open		a	

/ɨ/ may be pronounced as back [ɯ], close-mid [ɘ], or both [ɤ] by younger speakers. In other side, /ɨ/ realized as /ɤ/ in Bandung and as /ɯ/ in Tangerang, also as /ɘ/ by Indonesian speakers for Sundanese loanwords/names, e.g. keukeuh /kɘkɘh/ and Pameungpeuk /pamɘŋpɘʔ/.

Open-mid vowels may be heard as close-mid.

=== Consonants ===
According to Müller-Gotama (2001) there are 18 consonants in the Sundanese phonology: /b/, /t͜ɕ/, /d/, /ɡ/, /h/, /d͜ʑ/, /k/, /l/, /m/, /n/, /p/, /r/, /s/, /ŋ/, /t/, /ɲ/, /w/, /j/; however, influences from foreign languages have introduced several additional consonants such as /f~v/, /q/ /z/ (as in fonem, qur'an, xerox, zakat). The consonantal phonemes are transcribed with the letters p, b, t, d, k, g, c /t͡ɕ/, j /d͡ʑ/, h, ng (/ŋ/), ny /ɲ/, m, n, s /s/, w, l, r /r~ɾ/, and y /j/. Other consonants that originally appear in Indonesian loanwords are mostly transferred into native consonants: f/v /f/ → p, sy /ʃ/ → s, z /z/ → j /d͜ʑ/(initial) and s /s/ (final), and kh /x/ → h.

		Bilabial	Alveolar	Palatal	Velar	Glottal
Nasal		m	n	ɲ	ŋ	
Plosive/ Affricate	voiceless	p	t	t͜ɕ	k	
Plosive/ Affricate	voiced	b	d	d͜ʑ	ɡ	
Fricative			s			h
Approximant			l	j	w	
Trill			r			

Epenthetic semivowels /w/ and /j/ are inserted after a high vowel immediately followed by another vowel, as in the words:

- kuéh – /kuwɛh/
- muih – /muwih/
- béar – /bejar/
- miang – /mijaŋ/
- euweuh – /ɜwɜh/

== Register ==
Sundanese has an elaborate system of register distinguishing levels of formality. At the beginning of speech level development, six levels of Sundanese register were known: basa kasar (rough), sedeng (medium), lemes (polite), lemes pisan (very polite), kasar pisan (very rough), and basa panengah (intermediate). But since the 1988 Congress of Sundanese Language in Bogor, the speech level has been narrowed to only two parts: basa hormat (respectful) and basa loma (fair). Besides that, the term was changed to "tatakrama basa" (lit. 'language manners'), although the substance remained the same. The hormat variant is a subtle language to respect, while the loma variant is fair, neutral and familiar use. This variety of loma language is then used as a kind of "standard" variety of written languages in Sundanese society. Sundanese magazines, newspapers, literary books and theses, mostly using the loma variant.

Apart from the two previous levels, there is actually one more lowest level, namely cohag (rough). This level is only used when angry or just to show intimacy between speakers. This register can only be found in the Sundanese Priangan dialect, while other dialects such as Bantenese Language, generally do not recognize this register.

For many words, there are distinct loma and lemes forms, e.g. arék (loma) vs. badé (lemes) "want", maca (loma) vs. maos (lemes) "read". In the lemes level, some words further distinguish humble and respectful forms, the former being used to refer to oneself, and the latter for the addressee and third persons, e.g. rorompok "(my own) house" vs. bumi "(your or someone else's) house" (the loma form is imah).

Similar systems of speech levels are found in Javanese, Japanese, Korean and Thai.

== Basic vocabulary ==
=== Personal pronouns ===
Glos	Lemes	Loma	Cohag
1SG 'I'	abdi (informal) simkuring (formal)	urang (informal) kuring (formal) kami (non-formal, expressing speaker's superiority)	aing
2SG, 2PL 'you'	anjeun hidep (for younger)	manéh silaing	sia
3SG, 3PL 'he, she'	mantenna (to be respected), anjeunna	manéhna	si éta
1PL.EXCL 'we'	abdi sadayana (informal) simkuring sadayana (formal)	kuring saréréa	aing kabéhan
1PL.INCL 'we'	urang samudayana	arurang/urang	-
2PL 'you all'	aranjeun haridep (for younger)	maranéh	saria, sararia
3PL 'they'	aranjeunna	maranéhna	-

== Numeral ==
Number	Sundanese script	Sundanese
1	|᮱|	hiji, sa
2	|᮲|	dua
3	|᮳|	tilu
4	|᮴|	opat
5	|᮵|	lima
6	|᮶|	genep
7	|᮷|	tujuh
8	|᮸|	dalapan
9	|᮹|	salapan
10	|᮱᮰|	sapuluh
11	|᮱᮱|	sabelas
12	|᮱᮲|	dua belas
20	|᮲᮰|	dua puluh
21	|᮲᮱|	dua puluh hiji
30	|᮳᮰|	tilu puluh
31	|᮳᮱|	tilu puluh hiji
40	|᮴᮰|	opat puluh
50	|᮵᮰|	lima puluh
60	|᮶᮰|	genep puluh
70	|᮷᮰|	tujuh puluh
80	|᮸᮰|	dalapan puluh
90	|᮹᮰|	salapan puluh
100	|᮱᮰᮰|	saratus
hundreds		ratusan
1000	|᮱᮰᮰᮰|	sarébu
thousands		rébu

== Grammar ==
=== Root word ===
==== Root verb ====
English	Sundanese (formal)	Sundanese (polite)
eat	dahar	tuang (for other) neda (for myself)
drink	inum	leueut
write	tulis	serat
read	maca	maos
forget	poho	lali (for other) hilap (for myself)
remember	inget	émut
sit	diuk	linggih (for other) calik (for myself)
standing	nangtung	ngadeg
walk	leumpang	nyacat

==== Plural form ====
Other Austronesian languages (especially those in western Indonesia) commonly use reduplication to create plural forms. However, Sundanese inserts the ar infix into the stem word. If the stem word starts with l, or contains r following the infix, the infix ar becomes al. Also, as with other Sundanese infixes (such as um), if the word starts with vowel, the infix becomes a prefix. Examples:

1. Mangga téh, tarahuna haneut kénéh. "Please ma'am, the bean curds are still warm/hot." The plural form of tahu 'bean curd, tofu' is formed by infixing ar after the initial consonant.
2. Barudak leutik lalumpatan. "Small children running around." Barudak "children" is formed from budak (child) with the ar infix; in lumpat (run) the ar infix becomes al because lumpat starts with l.
3. Ieu kaén batik aralus sadayana. "All of these batik clothes are beautiful." Formed from alus (nice, beautiful, good) with the infix ar that becomes a prefix because alus starts with a vowel. It denotes the adjective "beautiful" for the plural subject/noun (batik clothes).
4. Siswa sakola éta mah balageur. "The students of that school are well-behaved." Formed from bageur ("good-behaving, nice, polite, helpful") with the infix ar, which becomes al because of r in the root, to denote the adjective "well-behaved" for plural students.

However, it is reported that this use of al instead of ar (as illustrated in (4) above) does not to occur if the 'r' is in onset of a neighbouring syllable. For example, the plural form of the adjective curiga (suspicious) is caruriga and not *caluriga, because the 'r' in the root occurs at the start of the following syllable.

The prefix can be reduplicated to denote very-, or the plural of groups. For example, "bararudak" denotes many, many children or many groups of children (budak is child in Sundanese). Another example, "balalageur" denotes plural adjective of "very well-behaved".

=== Active form ===
Most active forms of Sundanese verbs are identical to the root, as with diuk "sit" or dahar "eat". Some others depend on the initial phoneme in the root:

1. Initial /d/, /b/, /f/, /ɡ/, /h/, /j/, /l/, /r/, /w/, /z/ can be put after prefix nga like in ngadahar.
2. Initial /i/, /e/, /u/, /a/, /o/ can be put after prefix ng like in nginum "drink".

=== Negation ===
There are several words to negate a statement in Sundanese. These are also different by the polite (lemes) and casual (loma) registers, as well as dialect.

==== Polite ====
In Priangan Sundanese, Polite negation is done by adding a henteu (the shorter form, teu is also commonly used) to negate most verbs (akin to adding a "not" to English "do" or "does"). To negate clauses where the subject is linked to adjectives or nouns (where, in English, it would normally require a linking verb like "be"), sanés is used.

- Abdi teu acan neda. "I have not eaten yet."

In this sentence, "acan" is used to signpost that the speaker has not done something, but they will do it in a short notice.

- Buku abdi mah sanés nu ieu. "My book is not this one."

Other words that can be used to negate clauses are moal (to signpost that the speaker is not going to do something) and alim (to show that the speaker does not want to do something). Other Sundanese dialects may have different ways to negate statements.

==== Casual ====
There are a wide range of casual negation helper words. In Priangan Sundanese, this can be done with a number of words.

- Urang acan dahar. "I have not eaten yet."

The shorter version, can, is also commonly used especially in spoken speech.

- Buku Urang mah lain nu ieu. "My book is not this one."

The word lain can be used as a casual variant of sanés.

Moal and its longer variant moal waka can also be used casually. Other words include teu hayang (which can also sound aggressive depending on context) and embung (which is somewhat a casual counterpart of alim).

=== Question ===
Dupi (for polite situation)/Ari (for formal situation)-(question)

example:

Polite:

- Dupi Tuang Rama nyondong di bumi? "Is your father at home?"
- Dupi bumi di palih mana? "Where do you live?"

Formal:

- Ari Bapa aya di imah? "Is your father at home?"
- Ari imah di beulah mana? "Where do you live?"

=== Interrogatives ===
English	Sundanese (formal)	Sundanese (polite)	Indonesian
what	naon		apa
who	saha		siapa
whose/whom	nu saha	kagungan saha	punya siapa
where	(di) mana	(di) manten	(di) mana
when	iraha		kapan
why	naha, kunaon		kenapa
how	kumaha		bagaimana
how many	sabaraha		berapa

=== Passive form ===
Polite:

- Buku dibantun ku abdi. "The book is brought by me." Dibantun is the passive form ngabantun "bring".
- Pulpén ditambut ku abdi. "The pen is borrowed by me."
- Soal ieu dipidamel ku abdi. "This problem is done by me."
- Kacasoca dianggo ku abdi. "Glasses worn by me."

Formal:

- Buku dibawa ku urang. "The book is brought by me." Dibawa is the passive form mawa "bring".
- Pulpén diinjeum ku urang. "The pen is borrowed by me."
- Soal ieu digawékeun ku urang. "This problem is done by me."
- Tasma dipaké ku urang. "Glasses worn by me."

=== Adjectives ===
Examples:

teuas (hard), tiis (cool for water and solid objects), tiris (cool for air), hipu (soft), lada (hot/spicy, usually for foods), haneut (warm), etc.

=== Prepositions ===
==== Place ====
Sundanese has three generic prepositions for spatial expressions:

- di: 'in', 'at' etc., indicating position
- dina/na: 'on', 'at' etc., indicating specific position
- ka: 'to', indicating direction (from places like city, country, buildings, rooms, street, human, entities, etc. and treating the noun as a place where something happens)
- kana: 'to', indicating specific direction (from things, tools, containers, plants, organs or parts of body, etc. and treating the noun as an object)
- ti: 'from', indicating origin
- tina: 'from', indicating specific origin

Using different type of prepositions can result in different meanings.

di cai: at the bathroom/toilet

dina cai: inside of water

ka cai: going to a bathroom/toilet

kana cai: into water

ti cai: (someone) comes from the bathroom/toilet

tina cai: (something) made of water, or (something) comes from water

ka mobil: going inside a car

kana mobil: something is done/happened to a car

To express more specific spatial relations (like 'inside', 'under' etc.), these prepositions have been combined with locative nouns:

Formal	Polite	Gloss
di jero	di lebet	inside
di luar	di luar	outside
di gigir	di gédéng	beside
di luhur	di luhur	above
di handap	di handap	below
di tukang	di pengker	behind
di hareup	di payun	in front

Di gigir/luhur/handap/tukang/hareup (also ka gigir, ti gigir etc.) are absolute adverial expressions without a following noun. To express relative position, they have to add the suffix -eun, e.g.:

Polite:

- di luhur bumi – 'on top of the house'
- dina luhur lomari – 'on top of the cupboard'
- ti pengker bumi – 'from behind the house', alternative version: pengkereun bumi
- tina pengker lomari – 'from behind the cupboard'

Formal:

- di luhur imah – 'on top of the house'
- dina luhur lomari – 'on top of the cupboard'
- ti tukang imah – 'from behind the house'
- tina tukang lomari – 'from behind the cupboard'

Di jero, di luar and the polite forms luhur & pengker can be used both with and without a following noun.

==== Time ====
English	Sundanese (formal)	Sundanese (polite)
before	saacan/saméméh	sateuacan
after	sanggeus	saparantos
during	sabot, basa	sawaktos
past	baheula	kapungkur

==== Miscellaneous ====
English	Sundanese (formal)	Sundanese (polite)
from	tina/ti	tina/ti
for	jang, paragi	kanggo/kanggé

== Sample text ==
The following texts are excerpts from article 1 of the Universal Declaration of Human Rights in Sundanese, along with the original declaration in English.

Sundanese in Latin script

Sakumna jalma gubrag ka alam dunya téh sipatna merdika jeung boga martabat katut hak-hak anu sarua. Maranéhna dibéré akal jeung haté nurani, campur-gaul jeung sasamana aya dina sumanget duduluran.

Sundanese in Sundanese script

ᮞᮊᮥᮙ᮪ᮔ ᮏᮜ᮪ᮙ ᮌᮥᮘᮢᮌ᮪ ᮊ ᮃᮜᮙ᮪ ᮓᮥᮑ ᮒᮦᮂ ᮞᮤᮕᮒ᮪ᮔ ᮙᮨᮁᮓᮤᮊ ᮏᮩᮀ ᮘᮧᮌ ᮙᮁᮒᮘᮒ᮪ ᮊᮒᮥᮒ᮪ ᮠᮊ᮪-ᮠᮊ᮪ ᮃᮔᮥ ᮞᮛᮥᮃ. ᮙᮛᮔᮦᮂᮔ ᮓᮤᮘᮦᮛᮦ ᮃᮊᮜ᮪ ᮏᮩᮀ ᮠᮒᮦ ᮔᮥᮛᮔᮤ, ᮎᮙ᮪ᮕᮥᮁ-ᮌᮅᮜ᮪ ᮏᮩᮀ ᮞᮞᮙᮔ ᮃᮚ ᮓᮤᮔ ᮞᮥᮙᮍᮨᮒ᮪ ᮓᮥᮓᮥᮜᮥᮛᮔ᮪.

Sundanese in Pegon script

«ساكومنا جالما ڮوبراڮ كا عالم دنيا تَيه سيڤاتنا مَيرديكا جۤڠ بَوڮا مرتبة كاتوت حق۲ أنو سارووا. مارانَيهنا ديبَيرَي أكال جۤڠ هاتَي نورانی، چامڤور-ڮأول جۤڠ ساسامانا أيا دينا سوماڠَيت دودولوران.»

Sound sample

English

All human beings are born free and equal in dignity and rights. They are endowed with reason and conscience and should act towards one another in a spirit of brotherhood.

== See also ==
- Sundanese alphabet
- Sundanese (Unicode block)
- Sundanese Wednesday

== Bibliography ==
- Hardjadibrata, R.R. (1985). Sundanese: A Syntactical Analysis. Pacific Linguistics. Canberra: Australian National University. doi:10.15144/PL-D65.
- Kurniawan, Eri; Davies, William D. (2015). "Finiteness in Sundanese". University of Hawai'i Press. Vol. 54. Oceanic Linguistics. pp. 1–16. doi:10.1353/ol.2015.0010.
- Eri Kurniawan (2013). Sundanese complementation (Doctor of Philosophy (PhD) thesis). University of Iowa. doi:10.17077/etd.09n28b9j.
