= Lebak =

Lebak may refer to the following locations:

- Lebak, Sultan Kudarat, a municipality in Sultan Kudarat, Philippines
- Lebak Regency, a regency in Banten, Indonesia
- Lebak Cibedug, a megalithic pyramid site in Banten, Indonesia
- Lebak Bulus Stadium, Jakarta, Indonesia
- Lebak Bulus MRT Station, Jakarta, Indonesia
