= Cirebon Sundanese =

Sundanese dialect

- Basa Sunda Cirebon
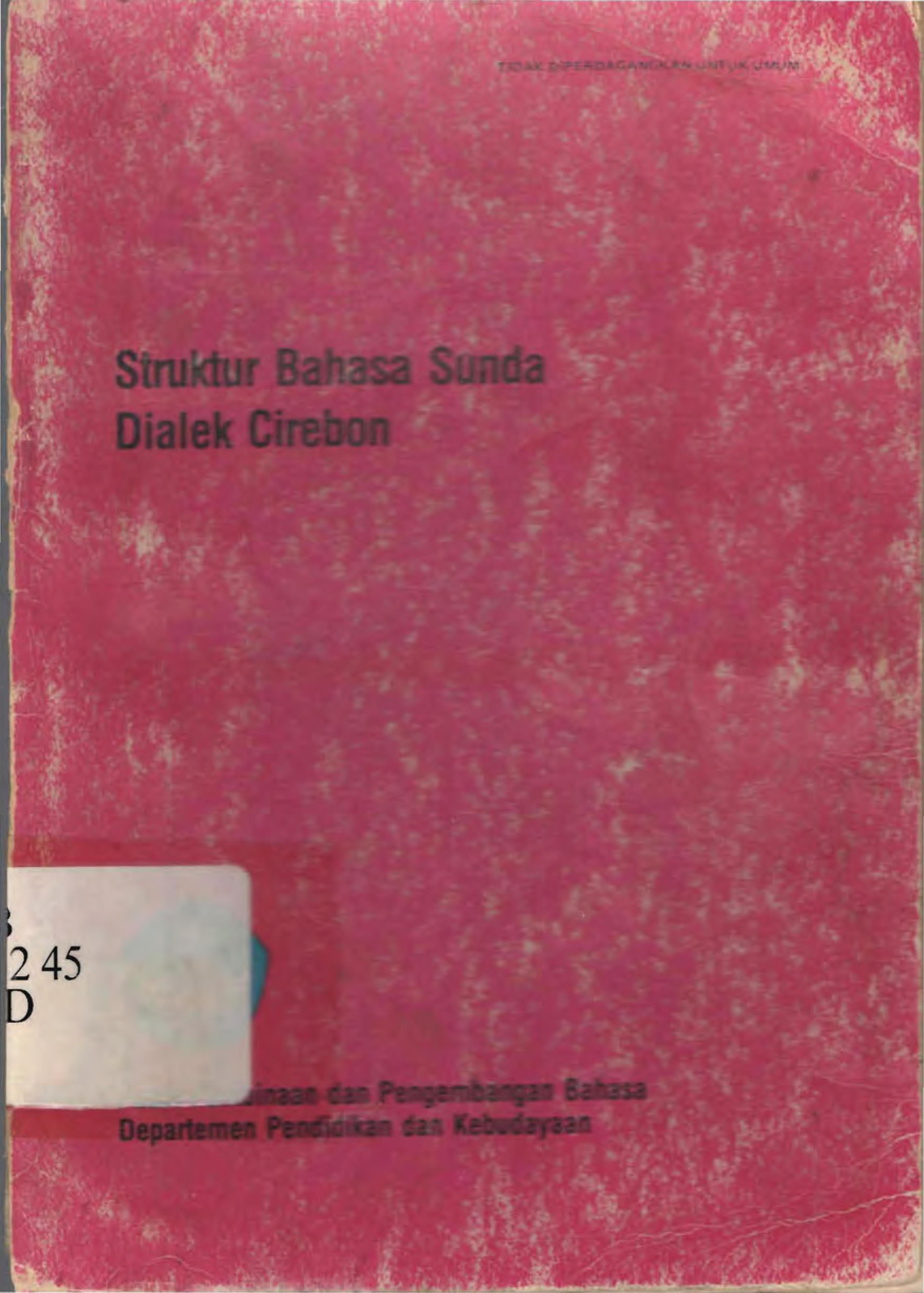
- Book cover of Struktur Bahasa Sunda Dialek Cirebon published in 1985.
- Region: ex-Residency of Cirebon and its surroundings, which includes Kuningan, Majalengka, Cirebon, and Indramayu
- Language family: Austronesian: Malayo-Polynesian; Malayo-Sumbawan (?); Sundanese; Cirebon Sundanese
- Dialects: Brebes; Cirebon; Indramayu; Kuningan; Majalengka
- Writing system: Latin

Language codes
- ISO 639-3: –
- Glottolog: cire1239 cire1241

Cirebon Sundanese (Sundanese: Basa Sunda Cirebon), known as Northeast Sundanese, is a collection of Sundanese language varieties found in the former Cirebon Residency area and its surroundings, which includes Kuningan, Majalengka, Cirebon (city and regency), and Indramayu. The Cirebon Sundanese is estimated to have about 60% of the total population inhabiting the former Cirebon Residency area as its speakers. Referring to statistical data in 2020, the accumulated population in the former Cirebon Residency area is 6,567,393, thus the number of Cirebon Sundanese speakers is about 3,940,436 people.

Cirebon Sundanese includes a wide variety of conversations or dialects from Sundanese in the Northeast dialect (Kuningan), Sundanese in the Middle-East dialect (Majalengka), and several varieties of Sundanese dialects that directly border the Javanese cultural area or Cirebon culture, for example, the Parean Sundanese in Kandanghaur and the Lelea Sundanese in Lelea, Indramayu Regency, which borders directly with the Cirebon-Indramayu cultural area which uses the Cirebon-Indramayu dialect. The Banyumas Javanese dialect was brought by immigrants from Tegal and Brebes in the early 20th century via the Tegal-Brebes railway line to the western region of Indramayu, also influencing the Sundanese language there.

The Cirebon Sundanese language is still alive and used today as an oral means of communication in daily activities and socio-cultural life since ancient times. The considerable distance between the region of Cirebon Sundanese speakers and the Priangan Sundanese (standard Sundanese) has caused distinctiveness in Cirebon Sundanese which differs from standard Sundanese. These differences are found in terms of language structure, vocabulary, and intonation, thereby creating certain patterns in phrases, clauses, and sentence arrangements. Because the Cirebon Sundanese has a fairly wide area of speech, its function and position hold significant meaning. From the realities encountered in the field, the Cirebon Sundanese is used as a link between community members and government officials, as well as among community members themselves.

== Vocabulary ==
The following is the vocabulary of various conversations in Cirebon Sundanese dialect.

Cirebon Sundanese	Banten Sundanese	Priangan Sundanese	Kuningan Sundanese¹	Majalengka Sundanese¹	Indramayu Sundanese²	Binong Sundanese	Gloss	Information
manéh, sia	manéh, dia	anjeun	nyanéh	manéh	manéh, inya, kita	sira, manéh, ko	you	In Indramayu Sundanese, the word kita has a more polite meaning than the word inya.
aing, kami, urang	aing	aing, abdi, urang	aing, kami	uing	aing, kami, kola	urang, kuring, kami, nyong	I	In Kuningan Sundanese, the word kami has a more polite meaning than the word aing, as well as in Indramayu Sundanese. However, in Indramayu Sundanese there is a more polite word than kami, namely the word kola.

Notes

- (¹) Kuningan Sundanese and Majalengka Sundanese are still included in the Cirebon Sundanese variety, even though they have several differences, so they are considered their own dialects.
- (²) Indramayu Sundanese is a variety of Sundanese that still uses archaic Sundanese words. Only spoken in the Kandanghaur and Lelea districts, with two dialects, namely Parean Sundanese and Lelea Sundanese.
