= Sundanese Wednesday =

Sundanese Wednesday, which popularised Rebo Nyunda, is a program of thematic days in Bandung City, West Java, Indonesia. Every Wednesday, people in Bandung talk Sundanese in their communication and also wear Sundanese clothes. The Bandung City Government developed this program to conserve Sundanese culture as their local culture. Now, this program is not only held in Bandung City, but Garut Regency and Bogor City also.
