= Lake Bandung =

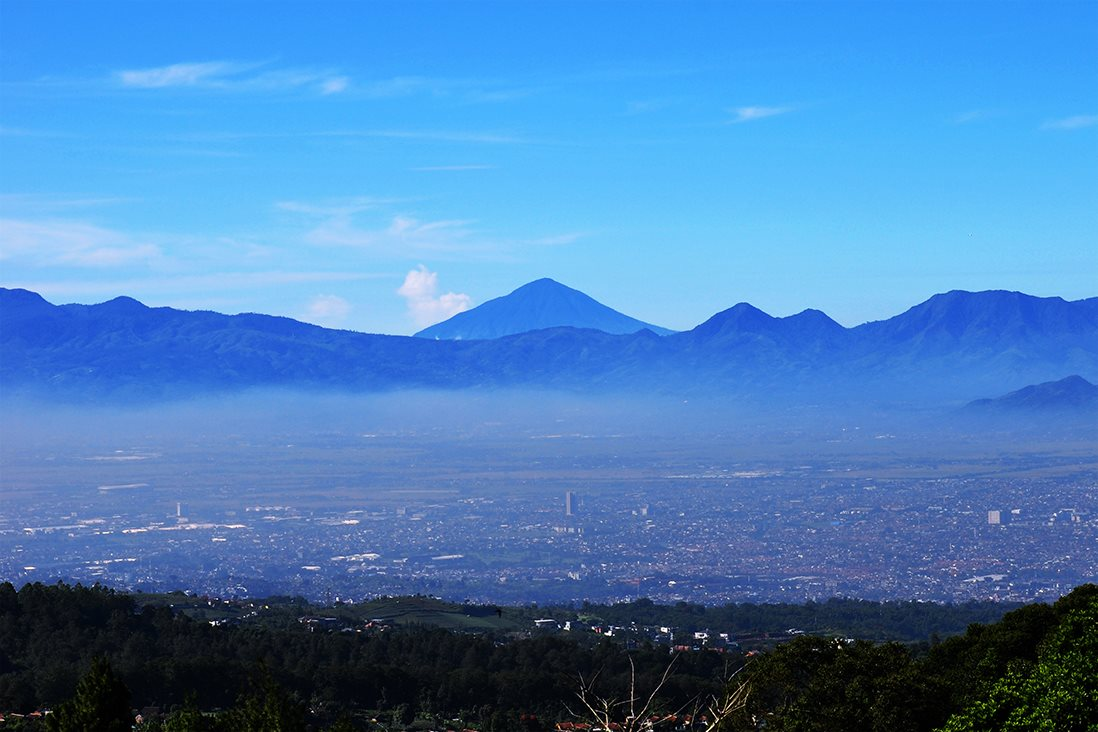
- The site of which lake Bandung used to be filled is now the Bandung Basin.

- Coordinates: 6°55′26″S 107°36′23″E
- Type: former lake
- Surface elevation: 725 metres (2,379 ft)

Lake Bandung (Sundanese: Situ Hiang) was a prehistoric lake located in and around the city of Bandung, Parahyangan highlands, West Java, Indonesia. believed to exist between 126,000 and 20,000 BCE in the Pleistocene due to the violent eruption of Mount Sunda that blocked the Tarum River (or "Citarum", as the prefix "ci" literally means "river" in Sundanese), causing the lowlands to begin to be inundated with water, eventually forming a lake.

Today, the lake had dried out and revealed the bottom of a geological basin known as the Bandung basin. It is mostly filled with habitation and industrial areas, paddy fields and orchards. It is believed that this low-lying basin has caused the southern suburbs of Bandung to suffer seasonal flooding during the rainy season, as the Citarum river that formed the lowermost backbone of the basin overwhelms and swells.

== Formation ==
=== Miocene period ===
During the Miocene period, the northern Bandung area was a sea, as evidenced by coral fossils that formed a coral reef along the Rajamandala ridge. Today, these reefs are limestone and mined as marble with ancient fauna. Bukit pegunungan api are believed to still be in the area around the Southern Mountains of Java. About 14 to 2 million years ago, the sea was tectonically uplifted and became a mountainous area which then 4 million years ago was hit with volcanic activity that produced hills that ran north and south between Bandung and Cimahi, including Pasir Selacau. 2 million years ago this volcanic activity shifted northwards and formed an ancient volcano called Mount Sunda, which is estimated to have reached a height of around 3000m above sea level. The remnant of this giant mountain is now a ridge.

=== Bandung basin ===
The Bandung basin is an ellipse-formed geological basin measuring 60 kilometres east-west, and 40 kilometres north-south, spanning from Padalarang in the west to Nagreg in the east, from Mount Tangkuban Perahu in the north to Mount Malabar in the south. The Bandung basin is surrounded by volcanic domes formed during the quaternary period in most sides, with only the western parts are dated older. Its stones were formed during the Neogene period, consisting mostly of limestones, creating Padalarang karst mountain. It is suggested that the Bandung basin is a multiple volcanic caldera system, created by both volcanic and tectonic activity as there are numbers of tectonic fault crossing the Parahyangan highland. For example, there is a Lembang fault that runs west-east axis located immediately north of Bandung under the town of Lembang. Sedimentation of the Bandung basin started around 126,000 BCE, which suggested that Bandung paleo-lake was first formed during this period.

=== Mount Sunda eruptions ===
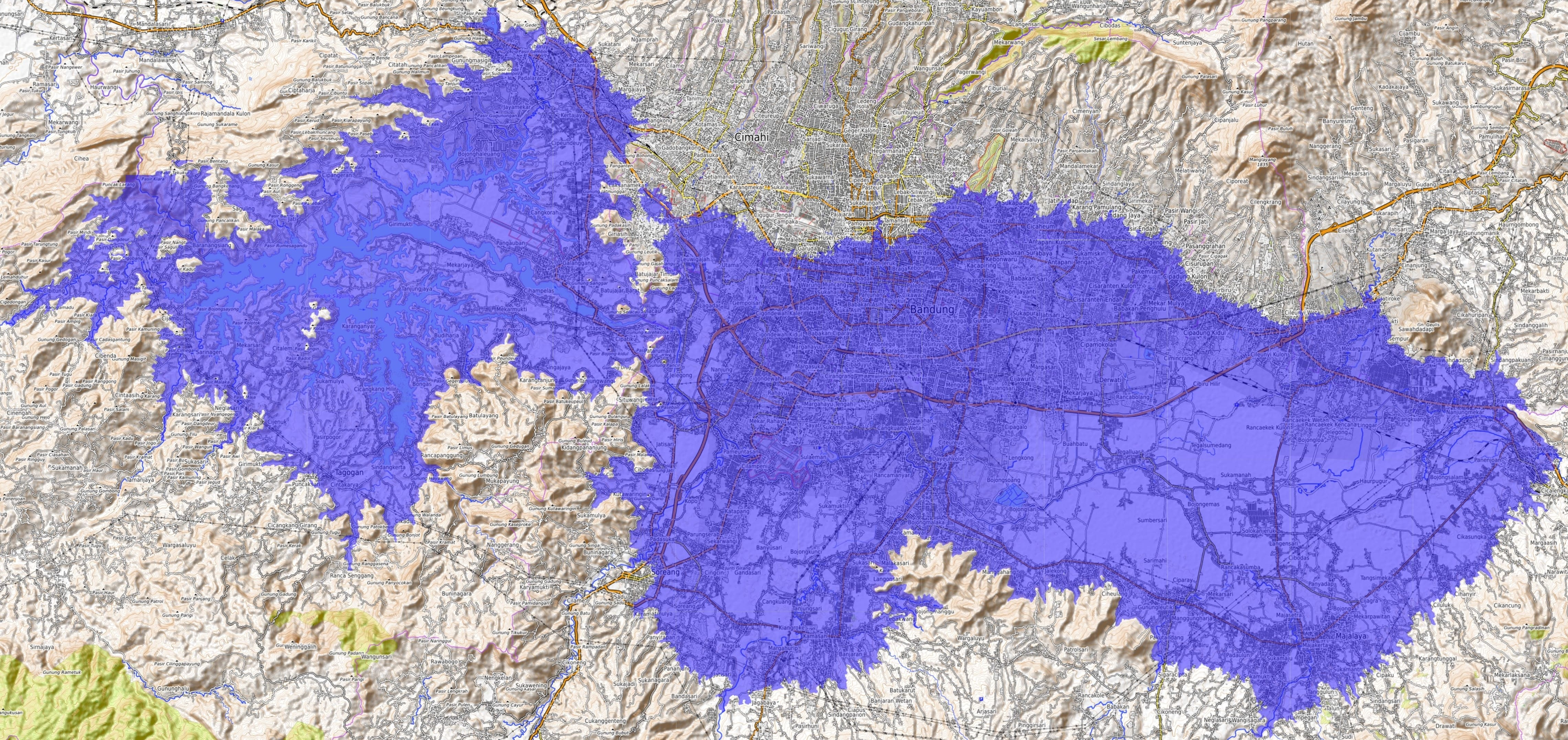
Approximate extent of lake Bandung

The Lake is estimated to stretch from Cicalengka to Padalarang, as well as from Dago to the border of Soreang and Ciwidey, so that the area of this ancient lake is estimated to reach almost 3 times the area of DKI Jakarta Province, with the average depth of the lake estimated to be around 20-30 metres.

The formation of the lake went further through the eruption of Mount Sunda. The paleo Sunda volcano — the predecessor of Tangkuban Perahu-Burangrang-Bukit Tunggul volcanic system — is estimated to have erupted 53,000 BCE. As the violent plinian eruption that engulfed the northern part of Bandung, west of the Cikapundung River to about Padalarang, the conic stratovolcano then collapsed and formed a caldera, measuring 5-10 km. In the centre of which Mount Tangkuban Parahu was exposed and stayed to its present day form. Along with the occurrence of the Lembang Fault to Mount Manglayang, this event separating the Lembang plateau from the Bandung plateau. This blocked the course of Citarum river and a natural dam was then formed, turning the basin into a lake known as "the Great Prehistoric Lake of Bandung".

== Dried lake ==
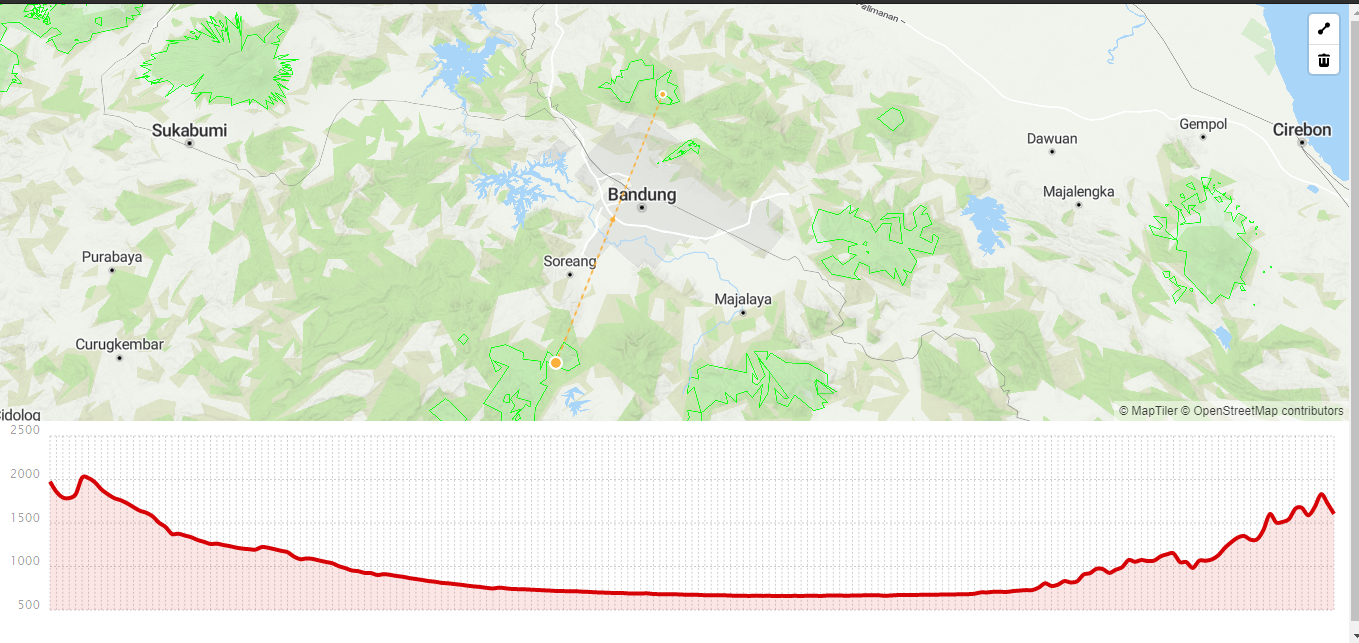
Elevation map of the Bandung Basin

The archaeological findings around the lake discovered several obsidian stone tools around Padalarang, suggesting that the surrounding area once supported early human habitation that provides water and food. All of these obsidian tools were discovered on elevation above 700 metres above the sea level, which suggested that the lake surface was once formed around this elevation.

According to geological studies, the Bandung paleo-lake sedimentation formation was last formed 18,000 BCE and started to dry up during that period. The cause of the drying up is a subject of study. It is suggested that either tectonic or volcanic activities in the area or gradual erosion, between Curug Cukangrahong and Curug Halimunhas, caused the natural dam to collapse and leaked the basin, allowing the lake water to flow north and meet the Cimeta River, then draining the lake's water into the Citarum river. The depletion of the lake then turned the Bandung Basin into a swamp.

== History ==
In 1935, van Bemmelen researched the geological history of Bandung. Observations were made of rock outcrops and morphological forms of volcanoes around Bandung. The research revealed that Bandung Lake was formed by the damming of the ancient Citarum River. This damming was hypothesised to be caused by a mass volcanic flow from the catastrophic eruption of Mount Tangkuban Parahu, which was preceded by the collapse of the ancient Sunda Mountain to the northwest of Bandung and the formation of a caldera within which Mount Tangkuban Parahu grew. Van Bemmelen explained in detail the geological history of Bandung starting in the Miocene period (20 million years ago), the creation of the Bandung basin, and relating it to the Mount Sunda Eruptions, which is estimated by van Bemmelen to have occurred about 11,000 years ago.

Geological research at the time founded that Situ Lembang (one of the side cones now called Mount Sunda) and Mount Burangrang are believed to be one of the side cones of this ancient Sunda Mountain. The other side of this ancient Sunda Mountain lies to the north of Bandung, particularly east of the Cikapundung River to Mount Manglayang, which van Bemmelen (1935-1949) called the Pulasari Block. These artefact sites were mainly found on this slope, which were further investigated by Roptzlev during the Japanese and Dutch occupation during the War of Independence. Another remnant of this ancient Sunda Mountain is Putri Hill in the north-east of Lembang.

In the 1990s, Dam and Suparan from the Directorate of Environmental Management of the Mining Department revealed the geological history of the Bandung plateau. This research, published in 1992, used advanced technology such as radiometric dating method with C-14 isotopes and U/TH disequilibrium method. Dam observed the layers of sedimentary deposits of Lake Bandung from two drills 60 m deep at Bojongsoang and 104 m deep at Sukamanah; conducted radiometric dating with the C-14 isotope method and one U/TH disequilibrium method; and observed outcrops and morphological forms around Bandung. In contrast, Sunardi based his research in 1997 on observations of palaeomagmatism and radio metric dating with the K-Ar method. Both research concluding the possibility of a prehistoric lake Bandung.

== Legend ==
There is a Sundanese legend of Sangkuriang that mentions the existence of the lake, as well as the mythical origin on the lake's creation and Mount Tangkuban Perahu. This might suggest the collective native Sundanese memories about the lake's existence, transmitted through oral tradition in the Pantun Sunda through the ages.

== See also ==
- Lake Borobudur – Former lake in Central Java
