= Malay Archipelago =

Islands between Mainland Southeast Asia and Australia

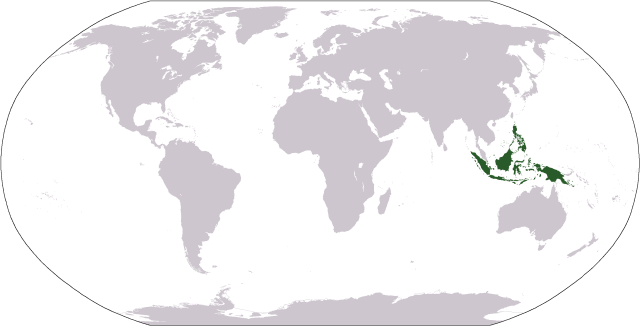
- World map highlighting Malay Archipelago
- Interactive map of Malay Archipelago

Geography
- Location: Maritime Southeast Asia, Melanesia
- Total islands: 25,000
- Major islands: Java, Luzon, Borneo, Mindanao, New Guinea, Sulawesi, Sumatra
- Area: 2,870,000 km^{2} (1,110,000 sq mi)
- Brunei
- Largest settlement: Bandar Seri Begawan
- East Timor
- Largest settlement: Dili
- Indonesia
- Largest settlement: Jakarta
- Malaysia
- Largest settlement: Kota Kinabalu
- Papua New Guinea
- Largest settlement: Port Moresby
- Philippines
- Largest settlement: Quezon City
- Singapore
- Largest settlement: Tampines

Demographics
- Population: 380,000,000
- Ethnic groups: Predominantly Austronesians, with minorities of Negritoes, Papuans, Melanesians, Overseas Chinese, Arab descendants, and Overseas Indians

The Malay Archipelago is the archipelago between Mainland Southeast Asia and Australia, and is also called Insulindia or the Indo-Australian Archipelago. The name was taken from the 19th-century European concept of a Malay race, later based on the distribution of Austronesian languages. It has also been called the "Malay world", "Nusantara", and the "East Indies" over time. The name is controversial in Indonesia due to its ethnic connotations and colonial undertones, which can overshadow the country's diverse cultures.

Situated between the Indian and Pacific oceans, the archipelago of over 25,000 islands and islets is the largest archipelago by area and fifth by number of islands in the world. It includes Brunei, East Timor, Indonesia, Malaysia (specifically East Malaysia), Papua New Guinea, the Philippines, and Singapore. The term is largely synonymous with Maritime Southeast Asia.

== Etymology and terminology ==
=== Malay archipelago ===
The term "Malay Archipelago" was derived from the European concept of a "Malay race" (a culturally-similar non-Oceanian subset of the Austronesian peoples), an outdated racial concept proposed by European explorers.

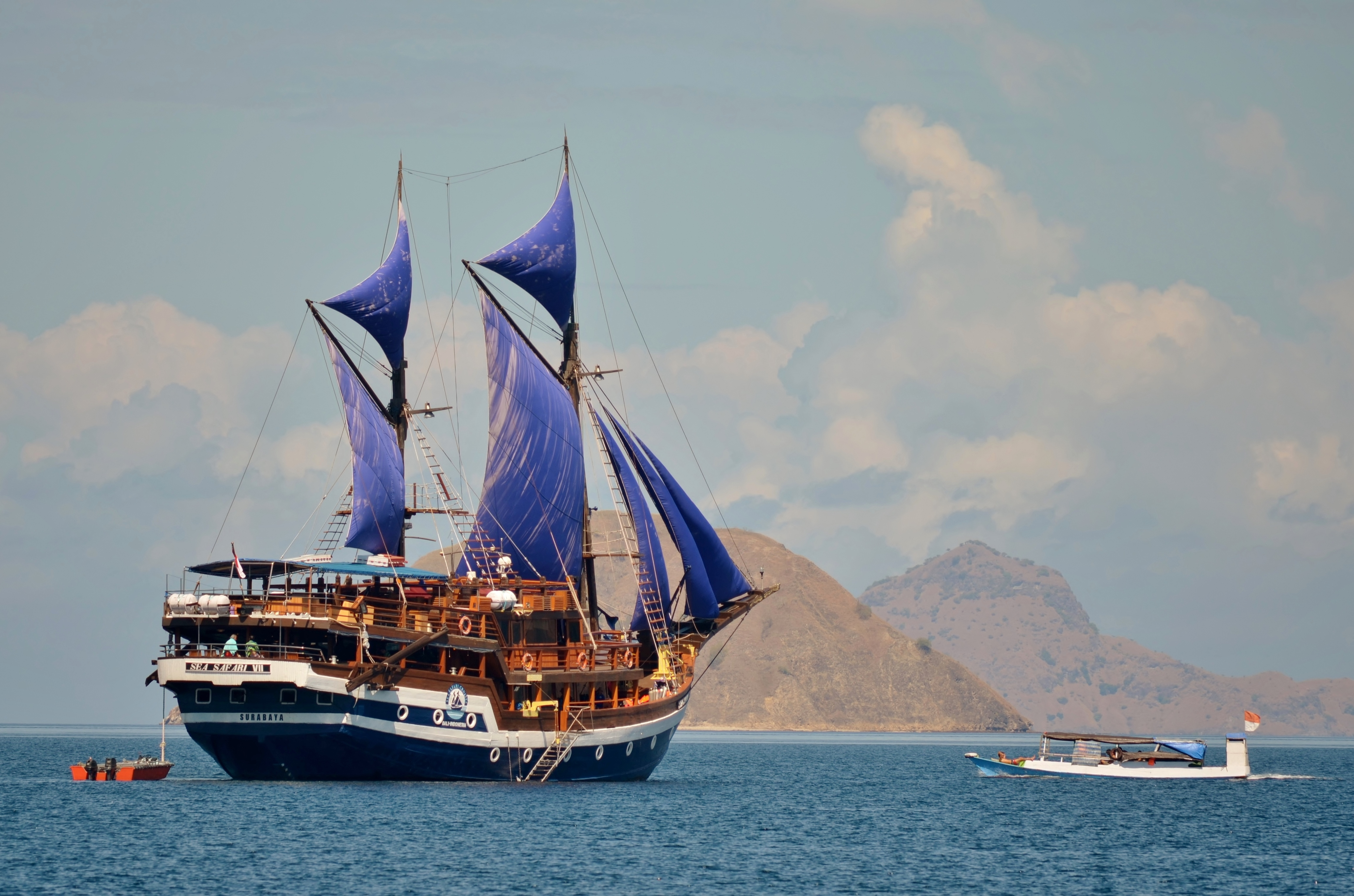
Pinisi sailing ship exploring Komodo island, part of Lesser Sunda Islands

The 19th-century naturalist Alfred Wallace used the term "Malay Archipelago" as the title of his influential book documenting his studies in the region. Wallace also referred to the area as the "Indian Archipelago" and the "Indo-Australian Archipelago". He included the Solomon Islands and Malay Peninsula in the region due to physiographic similarities. As Wallace noted, there are arguments for excluding Papua New Guinea for cultural and geographical reasons: Papua New Guinea is culturally quite different from the other countries in the region, and it is geologically not part of the continent of Asia, like the islands of the Sunda Shelf are (see Australia).

=== Nusantara ===
Nusantara is an ancient term originally used by one of the native ethnic groups of the archipelago. The term first appeared in historical records in the Mula Malurung inscription (1255), where it was used as a title for the territories under the authority of the King of Singhasari. The term resurfaced in the Pararaton, which records the Palapa oath sworn by Prime Minister Gajah Mada to expand the territorial reach of the Majapahit Empire. Later, the Nagarakretagama detailed the names of the various Nusantara regions brought under Majapahit rule.

Following the fall of Majapahit, the term remained in usage. In Classical Malay literature, Nusantara appears in the episode "Peristiwa Tatal dan Menarah Kepala Anak" of the Malay Annals, written in 1612.

=== Insulindia and East Indies ===
Insulindia is a somewhat archaic geographical term for Maritime Southeast Asia, sometimes extending as far as Australasia. More common in Portuguese and Spanish, it is also sometimes used in art history or anthropology to describe the interface zone between the cultures of Oceania and Southeast Asia.

Insulindia is used as a geopolitical term in academic discussions of the former European colonial possessions within Maritime Southeast Asia, especially Dutch East Indies and Portuguese East Indies ("Portuguese Insulindia") much as former French colonial possessions in Southeast Asia are still termed French Indochina. It is also used to describe and locate the Chinese cultural diaspora (the "insulindian Chinese") across the islands of Southeast Asia.

The archipelago was called the "East Indies" from the late 16th century and throughout the European colonial era. It is still sometimes referred to as such, but broader usages of the "East Indies" term had included Indochina and the Indian subcontinent.

=== Jazirah Al-Jawi ===
Arab merchants and cartographers referred to this archipelago as Al-Jazair Al-Jawi or Jazirah Al-Jawi (lit. 'Java Archipelago'). People originating from this region were commonly identified by the name 'Al-Jawi'. The term 'Jawi' was subsequently applied to the Jawi script, referring to the modified Arabic alphabet used to write the Malay language.

=== Maritime Southeast Asia, Island Southeast Asia, and Insular Southeast Asia ===
The term "Maritime Southeast Asia" is largely synonymous, covering both the islands in Southeast Asia and nearby island-like communities, such as those found on the Malay Peninsula.

== Geography ==
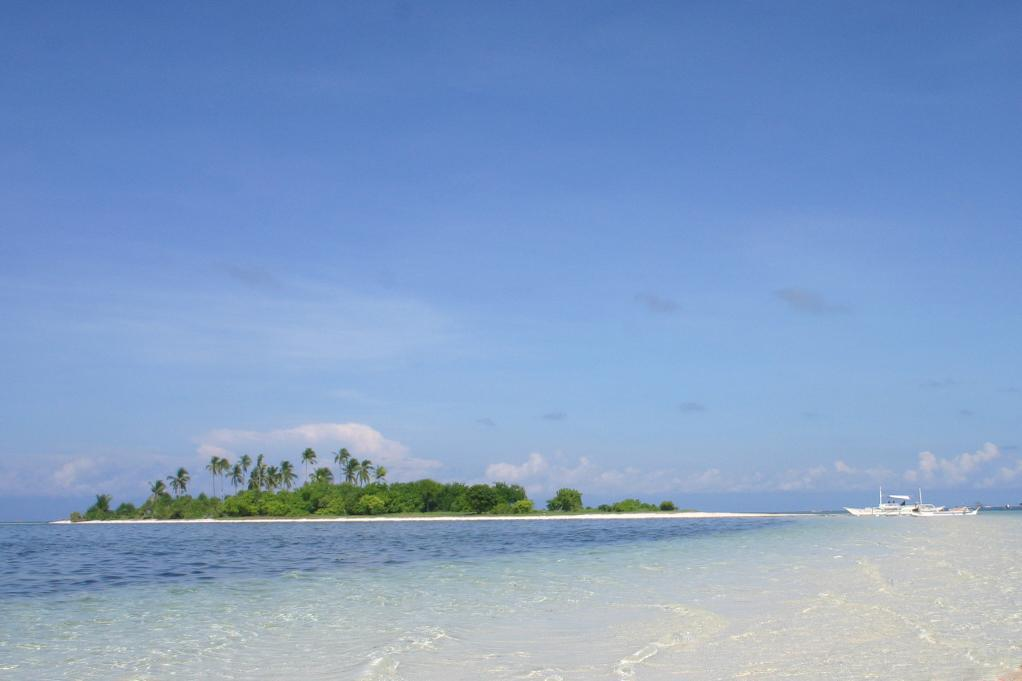
One of the majority of uninhabited islands of the Philippines.

The land and sea area of the archipelago exceeds 2 million km^{2}. The more than 25,000 islands of the archipelago consist of many smaller archipelagoes.

The major island groupings in the Indonesian Archipelago include the Maluku Islands, New Guinea, and the Sunda Islands. The Sunda Islands comprise two island groups: the Greater Sunda Islands and the Lesser Sunda Islands.

The major island groupings in the Philippine Archipelago include Luzon, Mindanao, and the Visayan Islands.

The seven largest islands are New Guinea, Borneo, Sumatra, Sulawesi and Java in Indonesia; and Luzon and Mindanao in the Philippines.

Geologically, the archipelago is one of the most active volcanic regions in the world. Producing many volcanoes especially in Java, Sumatra and Lesser Sunda Islands region where most volcanoes over 3,000 m (9,843 ft) high are situated. Tectonic uplifts also produce large mountains, including the highest, Mount Kinabalu in Sabah, Malaysia, with a height of 4,095.2 m (13,436 ft) and Puncak Jaya on Papua, Indonesia at 4,884 m (16,024 ft). Other high mountains in the archipelago include Puncak Mandala, Indonesia at 4,760 m (15,617 ft) and Puncak Trikora, Indonesia, at 4,750 m (15,584 ft).

The climate throughout the archipelago is tropical, owing to its position on the equator.

=== Biogeography ===
Wallace used the term Malay Archipelago as the title of his influential book documenting his studies in the region. He proposed what would come to be known as the "Wallace Line", a boundary that separated the flora and fauna of Asia and Australia. The ice age boundary was formed by the deep water straits between Borneo and Sulawesi; and through the Lombok Strait between Bali and Lombok. This is now considered the western border of the Wallacea transition zone between the zoogeographical regions of Asia and Australia. The zone has a mixture of species of Asian and Australian origin, and its own endemic species.

== See also ==
- Archipelago
- East Indies
- Ethnic groups in Southeast Asia
- Greater Indonesia
- Indonesian archipelago
- Malay Peninsula
- Malayness
- Maphilindo
- Maritime Southeast Asia
- Names of Indonesia
- Nusantara
