= Melanopella =

Scientific classification
- Domain: Eukaryota
- Kingdom: Animalia
- Phylum: Arthropoda
- Subphylum: Chelicerata
- Class: Arachnida
- Order: Opiliones
- Family: Sclerosomatidae
- Genus: Melanopella; Roewer, 1931

Genus of harvestmen/daddy longlegs

Melanopella is a genus of harvestmen in the family Sclerosomatidae from the Sunda Islands.

== Species ==
- Melanopella feuerborni Roewer, 1931
- Melanopella insularis Roewer, 1931
- Melanopella marginata Roewer, 1955
