= Lembang =

Town in West Java, Indonesia

Coordinates: 6.817°S 107.617°E

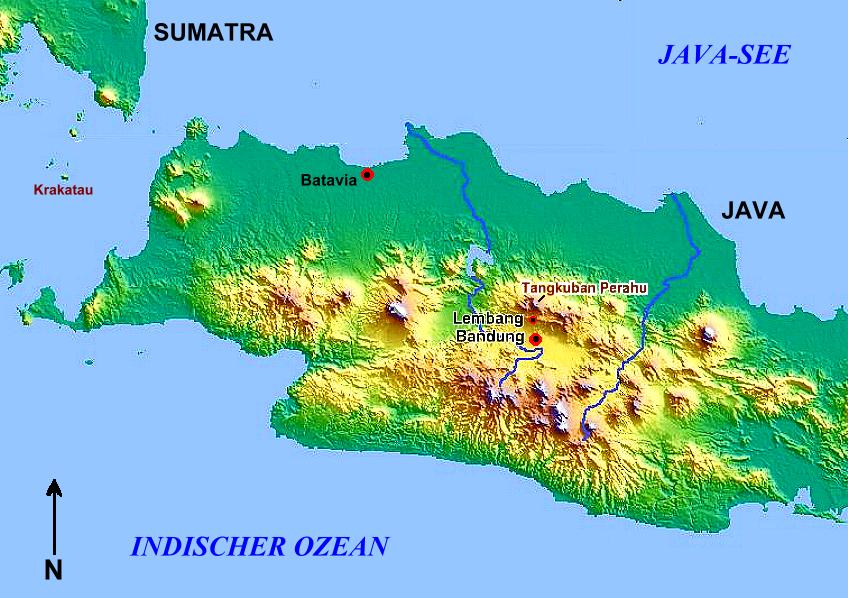
West Java (Batavia - Bandung - Lembang)

Lembang is a town and an administrative district (kecamatan) of West Bandung Regency in the province of West Java on Java, Indonesia. The town has about 14,000 inhabitants (as at mid 2024). The population of the Lembang District was 173,350 at the 2010 Census and 197,640 at the 2020 Census; the official estimate as at mid 2024 was 209,084 and the land area was 98.22 km^{2}. The district is sub-divided into sixteen administrative villages (desa), all sharing the post code of 40391.

Lembang is situated between 1,312 and 2,084 metres above sea level. Its highest point is on top of Tangkuban Perahu Mt. The temperature usually ranges between 17 and 24 degrees Celsius.

Lembang means "dent" in Sundanese.

== Economy ==
Besides the tourism industry and agriculture, Lembang also has 69,000 dairy cow farmers who supply the Frisian Flag, Diamond, and Danone.

== Education and military ==
Lembang has more than a dozen government centers of education and research and military bases.

== Lembang Fault ==
The Lembang Fault is an active geological fault with a slip rate of 2 millimeters per year that crosses Lembang city and runs 22 kilometers north of the Bandung basin, ranging from Mount Palasari to Cisarua. 700 years ago, earthquakes occurred at several points along the fault line and could potentially trigger up to a magnitude 7 quake. This potential quake could impact the more than nine million people who are currently living in the Bandung Basin area and its surrounding area.
