= Death Valley stadium =

Death Valley stadium may refer to:

- Memorial Stadium (Clemson), Clemson, South Carolina
- Tiger Stadium (LSU), Baton Rouge, Louisiana
- Yankee Stadium (1923), left-center field of the former stadium in the Bronx, New York City, which was 399 feet from home plate and was difficult to hit a home run over

== See also ==
- Death Valley (disambiguation)
