= Valley of Shadows =

Valley of Shadows may refer to:

- Valley of Shadows (ballet), a 1983 one-act ballet;
- Valley of Shadows (2017 film), a 2017 Norwegian film;
- Valley of Shadows (2024 film), a 2024 Spanish film.

== See also ==
- Valley of the Shadows
- Valley of the Shadow (disambiguation)
