= Valley of Death =

Valley of Death may refer to:

== Places ==
- Valley of Death (Bydgoszcz), the site of a 1939 Nazi mass murder and mass grave site in northern Poland
- Valley of Death (Crimea), the site of the Charge of the Light Brigade in the 1854 Battle of Balaclava
- Valley of Death (Gettysburg), the 1863 Gettysburg Battlefield landform of Plum Run
- Valley of Death (Dukla Pass), the site of a tank battle during the Battle of the Dukla Pass in 1944 (World War II)
- The Valley of Death, an area of poisonous volcanic gas near the Kikhpinych volcano in Russia
- The Valley of Death, an area of poisonous volcanic gas near the Tangkuban Perahu volcano in Indonesia
- The Valley of Death, a nickname for the Korangal Valley in Afghanistan where 54 U.S. servicemen died during the War in Afghanistan (2001–2021)
- Valley of Death, a nickname for the highly polluted city of Cubatão, Brazil
- Valley of Death, a nickname for the Bay of Biscay where several U-boats sank from air attacks from 1943 onwards (World War II)

== Other uses ==
- The Valley of Death (audio drama), a Doctor Who audio play
- The Valley of Death (film), a 1968 western film
- "Valley of Death", the flawed NewsStand: CNN & Time debut program that caused the Operation Tailwind controversy
- A literary element of "The Charge of the Light Brigade" by Alfred, Lord Tennyson
- A reference to the difficulty of covering negative cash flow in the early stages of a start-up company; see Venture capital
- "The Valley of Death", a song by the Swedish heavy metal band Sabaton from the 2022 album The War to End All Wars
- A nickname for technology readiness levels 5-7, where investment is typically weakest

== See also ==
- Death Valley (disambiguation)
- Valley of the Shadow of Death (disambiguation)
