= Sunda Islands =

Island group in the Malay Archipelago

Coordinates: 2°00′S 110°00′E

Greater Sunda Islands

Lesser Sunda Islands

The Sunda Islands is a group of islands composed of the Greater Sunda Islands and the Lesser Sunda Islands (Indonesian: Kepulauan Sunda; Tetun: Illa Sunda), the Nusantara (outer islands) of the Indonesian Archipelago.

== Etymology ==
The name of the "Sunda islands" denotes the Sunda Shelf in the west and the Sahul Shelf in the east. Other terms associated with "Sunda" include the Sunda Island Arc or the arc of Sunda Islands, Sunda Fold or tectonic folding in the Natuna Sea, the Sunda Trench, and Sundaland.

The term "Sunda" derives from the Sanskrit word "Cuddha," meaning white. During the Pleistocene era, there was a large volcano named Mount Sunda located north of Bandung in West Java. Its eruption covered the surrounding area with white volcanic ash, giving rise to the name "Sunda." The use of the term "Sunda" to refer to the Indonesian region dates back to the claims of Claudius Ptolemaeus in 150 AD.

In the 16th century, the Portuguese established diplomatic relations with the Sunda Kingdom and mapped the territory of the Sunda Kingdom and its surroundings. They categorized the region into Greater Sunda (Sunda Besar) for the larger western islands and Lesser Sunda (Sunda Kecil) for the smaller eastern islands. Since then, the term "Sunda" has been widely adopted in earth sciences (geology-geography) as a reference for the Indonesian region, surpassing the usage of "Indonesia" in this field. The terms Greater Sunda and Lesser Sunda are commonly used in geological-geographical literature.

== Administration ==
The Sunda Islands are divided among five countries: Brunei, East Timor, Indonesia, Singapore and Malaysia. The majority of these islands fall under Indonesia’s jurisdiction. Borneo is split among Brunei, Indonesia, and Malaysia. Timor is split between East Timor and Indonesia. Sebatik is split between Indonesia and Malaysia.

== List of islands ==
- Greater Sunda Islands
  - Borneo
  - Java
  - Sulawesi
  - Sumatra
- Lesser Sunda Islands (from west to east)
  - Bali
  - Lombok
  - Sumbawa
  - Sumba
  - Komodo
  - Flores
  - Savu
  - Rote
  - Timor
  - Alor Archipelago
  - Atauro
  - Barat Daya Islands
  - Tanimbar Islands

== See also ==
- Name of Indonesia
- List of islands of Indonesia
- Komodo (island)
- Malay Archipelago
- Sunda Arc
- Sundaland
- Sunda Trench
- Banda Arc
- Wallacea
