= Names of Indonesia =

Names of the country

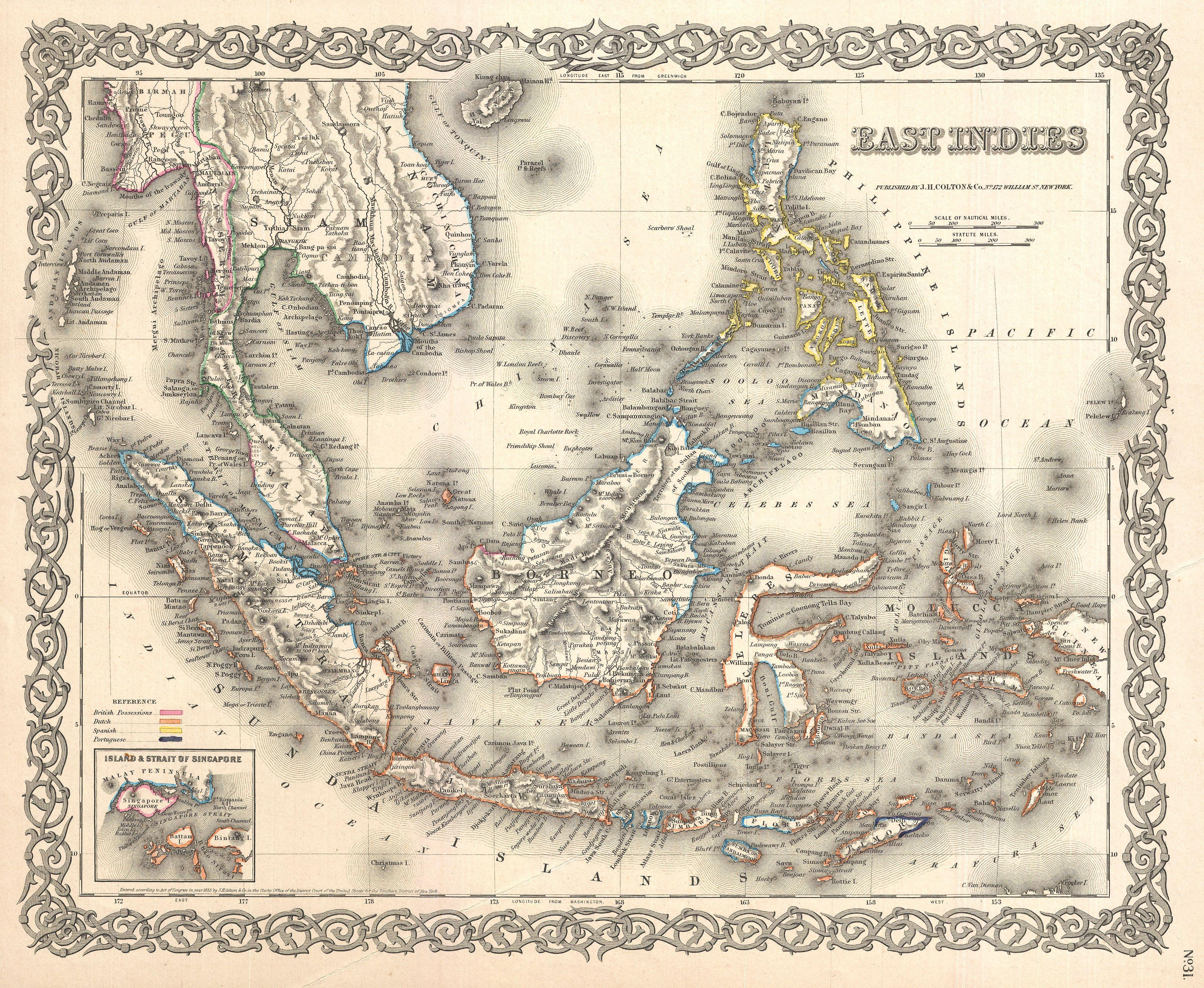
The region that is today identified as Indonesia has carried different names, such as "East Indies" in this 1855 map.

Indonesia is the common and official name to refer to the Republic of Indonesia or Indonesian Archipelago; however, other names, such as East Indies, are also known. Some names are considered obsolete and confined to certain periods of history, while some might be more geographically specific or general.

== History ==
On identifying geographical names of their lands, the Indonesian natives seldom transcend their traditional boundaries, which is relatively small confined in their tribal environs. There are around 1,300 distinct native ethnic groups in Indonesia, and 742 different languages, which add to the complexity and nonconformity on the naming of the region. The concept of identifying the whole archipelagic region that today forms Indonesia with a single name was unknown then. Geographical names usually applied to individual islands, such as Java, one of the earliest identified islands in the Indonesian archipelago. It was foreign traders and explorers from India, China, the Middle East, and Europe who finally chose the names of this region.

== Names recorded in ancient scriptures ==
The following ancient names were originally the names for some of the islands in present-day Indonesia (as pars pro toto).

=== Yavadvipa ===
The island of Java was the earliest island within Indonesia to be identified by the geographers of the outside world. "Yavadvipa" is mentioned in India's earliest epic, the Ramayana. It was mentioned that Sugriva, the chief of Rama's army, dispatched his men to Yawadvipa, the island of Java, in search of Sita.

=== Suvarnadvipa ===
Suvarnadvipa, "Golden Island", may have been used as a vague general designation of an extensive region in Southeast Asia, but over time, different parts of that area came to be designated by the additional epithets of island, peninsula or city. In contrast, the ancient name for the Indian subcontinent and its culturally familiar surrounding regions is Bhāratavarsha or Bhāratakhanda. In ancient Indonesia, the name Suvarnadvipa is used to designate Sumatra island; as counterpart of neighbouring Javadvipa or Bhumijava (Java island). Both Java and Sumatra are the principal islands in Indonesian history.

=== Iabadiu ===
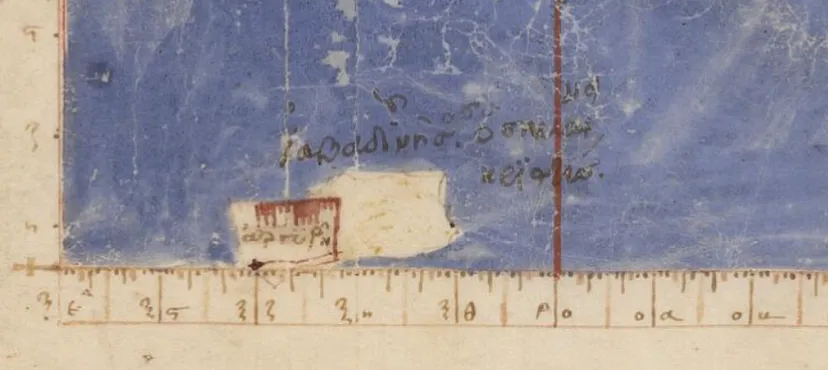
A close up map of the island of Ἰαβαδιοῦ Biblioteca Apostolica Vaticana, Urb.Gr.82, f.107v-108r.

The great island of Iabadiu or Jabadiu was mentioned in Ptolemy's Geographia composed around 150 CE in the Roman Empire. Iabadiu is said to mean "barley island", to be rich in gold, and have a silver town called Argyra at the west end. The name indicated Java, and seems to be derived from the Hindu name Java-dvipa (Yawadvipa). Despite the name's indicating Java, many suggest that it refers to Sumatra instead.

== Exonym names ==
The following names were originally the names present day Indonesia and several other surrounding states (as totum pro parte). They are mostly exonyms.

=== Jawi ===
Eighth-century Arab geographers identified the whole Maritime Southeast Asian region as "Jawi" (Arabic:جاوي). The word "Jawi" (جاوي) is an adjective for the Arabic noun Jawah (جاوة). Both terms may originate from an Indian source, the term "Javadvipa", the ancient name for Java, or from Javanese source because (Javanese: ꦗꦮꦶ, romanized: jawi) is the Javanese Krama form of the word (Javanese: ꦗꦮ, romanized: jawa) to mean Java (geographically: ꦠꦤꦃꦗꦮꦶ, romanized: tanah Jawi, or ethnically: ꦠꦶꦪꦁꦗꦮꦶ, romanized: tiyang Jawi). "Jawah" and "Jawi" may have been used by the Arabs as catch-all terms referring to the entire Maritime Southeast Asia and its peoples. Today, the term Jawi is also used to describe the Jawi alphabet, the Arabic script that has been used and modified to write in Southeast Asian languages, especially Malay.

=== Nanyang ===
Nanyang (南洋) (literally meaning "Southern Ocean"), is a Chinese term denoting the greater Maritime Southeast Asia region not only Indonesia, but also including Malaysia, Philippines, Singapore, and Brunei, but usually excluding other mainland Southeast Asian nations, especially the other nations on the Indochinese peninsula. It came into common usage in self-reference to the large ethnic Chinese migrant population in Southeast Asia. Nanyang is contrasted with Dongyang (Eastern Ocean), which refers to Japan.

=== Insulindia ===
Insulindia or Insulinde, is an archaic geographical term for Maritime Southeast Asia, encompassing the entire area situated between Australasia and Indochina. More common in Portuguese and Spanish, it is a combined word (portmanteau) from insula ("island") and india (India).

== Endonym names ==
The following names were endonym alternatives to "Indonesia".

=== Sunda Islands ===
Greater Sunda Islands

Lesser Sunda Islands

The Sunda Islands are a group of islands in the Indonesian Archipelago. They consist of the Greater Sunda Islands (roughly western part of present Indonesia) and the Lesser Sunda Islands (roughly southeastern part of present Indonesia).

The Sunda Islands are divided between four countries, namely Brunei, East Timor, Indonesia and Malaysia. The majority of these islands fall under the jurisdiction of Indonesia. Borneo is divided between Brunei, Indonesia and Malaysia. Timor Island is divided between East Timor and Indonesia. Two small islands also belong to East Timor.

Sunda (Sundanese: ᮞᮥᮔ᮪ᮓ, romanized: sunda) is the name of the ethnic group living in western part of Java Island. Today the Sundanese are the second largest such group in Indonesia after the Javanese.

=== Nusantara ===
Modern Wawasan Nusantara, the Indonesian archipelagic baselines pursuant to article 47, paragraph 9, of the UNCLOS

Nusantara is an Indonesian word for the Indonesian archipelago. The name originated from Old Javanese and literally means "archipelago".

The word Nusantara was taken from an oath by Gajah Mada in 1336, as written on an old Javanese manuscript Pararaton and Negarakertagama. Gajah Mada was a powerful military leader and prime minister of the Majapahit Empire who was credited with bringing the empire to its peak of glory. Gajah Mada delivered an oath called Sumpah Palapa, in which he vowed not to eat any food containing spices until he had conquered all of Nusantara under Majapahit.

In 1920, Ernest Francois Eugene Douwes Dekker (1879–1950), proposed "Nusantara" as a new name for this country instead of "Indonesia". He argued that the name was more indigenously developed, which did not contain any words etymologically inherited from the name Indies, Indus or India. This is the first instance of the term Nusantara appearing after it had been written in Pararaton manuscript.

The definition of Nusantara introduced by Douwes Dekker is different from its 14th century definition. During the Majapahit era, Nusantara was described as vassal areas to be conquered, the overseas possessions of Majapahit, in contrast with Negara Agung or the core of Majapahit. However, Douwes Dekker did not want this aggressive connotation, so he defined Nusantara as all the Indonesian regions from Sabang as far as Merauke. Although Douwes Dekker's proposal did not succeed, and the name "Indonesia" remained in use for the nation's name, the name "Nusantara" has been widely used in literature, printed and broadcast news materials and popular publications, thus it has become the synonym for Indonesia. Nusantara was chosen as the name for the new capital city of Indonesia.

== Modern names ==
Starting with Hindia-Belanda, academics began to refer the present day Indonesia with a single term. After the 1945 independence, the country officially adopted Indonesia as its formal name.

=== East Indies ===
The term "the Indies" derived from the Indus River flowing through modern-day Pakistan, India and western Tibet. It was applied by the ancient Greeks to most of the regions of Asia to the east of Persia. This usage dates at least from the time of Herodotus, in the 5th century BC (see Names of India). The term "Indies" was first used by European geographers to identify the geographic region of the Indian subcontinent, and the islands beyond.

After the discovery of America, the term was modified to include "east", to distinguish the area from the area associated with Columbus' discoveries, called the West Indies. During the Age of Discovery in the 16th century, "East Indies" became a term used by Europeans to identify what is now known as Indian subcontinent or South Asia, Southeastern Asia, and the islands of Oceania and Maritime Southeast Asia. During that era, the East Indies portion now called "Indonesia" fell under Dutch colonial control and therefore was referred to as Dutch East Indies.

=== Indonesia ===
Indonesia derives from Ancient Greek Indus (Ἰνδός) (the origin of the terms ‘India’ and Indies’) and nésos (νῆσος), meaning "island". The name dates to the 18th century, far predating the formation of independent Indonesia. In 1850, George Windsor Earl, an English ethnologist, proposed the terms Indunesians — and, his preference, Malayunesians — for the inhabitants of the "Indian Archipelago or Malayan Archipelago". In the same publication, a student of Earl's, James Richardson Logan, used Indonesia as a synonym for Indian Archipelago. However, Dutch academics writing in East Indies publications were reluctant to use Indonesia. Instead, they used the terms Malay Archipelago (Maleische Archipel); the Netherlands East Indies (Nederlandsch Oost Indië), popularly Indië; the East (de Oost); and Insulinde.

After 1900, the name Indonesia became more common in academic circles outside the Netherlands, and Indonesian nationalist groups adopted it for political expression. Adolf Bastian, of the University of Berlin, popularised the name through his book Indonesien oder die Inseln des Malayischen Archipels, 1884–1894. The first Indonesian scholar to use the name was Suwardi Suryaningrat (Ki Hajar Dewantara), when he established a press bureau in the Netherlands, Indonesisch Pers-bureau, in 1913. Between 1910 and 1915, Swiss linguist, Renward Brandstetter wrote An Introduction to Indonesian Linguistics in 4 essays, which was translated into English in 1916. It talked about the various similarities between languages in the region, and pioneered the concept of Common Indonesian [words] and Original Indonesian [words].

Although the name was originally meant for scientific purposes, on 28 October 1928, the name "Indonesia" gained more political significance when the native pro-independence nationalist youth in the Dutch East Indies declared the Youth Pledge, acknowledging Indonesia as one motherland, one nation, and upholding Indonesian as the language of unity.

=== Malayunesia ===
Malayunesia is another name next to Indunesia that was proposed by George Samuel Windsor Earl to identify the archipelago. It was a Greek translation of the Malay Archipelago also connected to the concept of Malay race, the inhabitant of the archipelago. It was said that Windsor Earl prefer the name Malayunesia (Malay Archipelago) instead of Indunesia (Indian Archipelago), because Malayunesia is an appropriate name for the Malay archipelago, while Indunesia can also refer to Ceylon (Sri Lanka) and Maldives. He also argues that Malay language is spoken throughout the archipelago.

== Nicknames ==
=== Equatorial Emerald ===
Some literature works and poems describe Indonesia in eloquent poetic names, such as Zamrud Khatulistiwa ("Equatorial Emerald" or "Emerald of the Equator"), which refers to Indonesian green and lush tropical rainforest as the emeralds, as well as the geographic position of Indonesia, along the equator. It was originally from the Dutch phrase Gordel van Smaragd ("Emerald of the Tropic") which was coined by Multatuli (a pen name used by Eduard Douwes Dekker, a 19th-century Dutch writer, who described Dutch East Indies as "'t prachtig ryk van Insulinde dat zich daar slingert om den evenaar, als een gordel van smaragd" ("the beautiful empire of Insulinde that girdles the equator like a belt of emerald").

=== Bumi Pertiwi and Tanah Air ===
Other local epithets such as Bumi Pertiwi ("Land of Earth or Mother Earth"), refer to Indonesia through its national personification, Ibu Pertiwi, and Tanah Air (Indonesian lit: "soil and water"), an Indonesian word for "homeland", motherland, or mother country.

== See also ==
- Malay Archipelago
- Maritime Southeast Asia

By ISO 639-3 code
Enter an ISO code to find the corresponding language article.
