= Sangkuriang =

Sundanese legend

Sangkuriang (Sundanese: ᮞᮀᮊᮥᮛᮤᮃᮀ) is a legend among Sundanese people in Indonesia. The legend tells about the creation of Lake Bandung, Mount Tangkuban Parahu, Mount Burangrang, and Mount Bukit Tunggul. The legend of Sangkuriang tells the story of a young man who falls in love with his mother, which is somewhat comparable to the Greek tragedy Oedipus.

From the legend, we can determine how long the Sundanese have been living in Java island. Firmly supported by geological facts, it is predicted that the Sundanese have been living on Java Island since a thousand years BCE.

The legend of Sangkuriang was almost certainly a story of oral tradition before being written down. The first written reference to the Sangkuriang legend appeared in the Bujangga Manik manuscript written on palm leaves at the end of the 15th century or the early 16th century AD. Prince Jaya Pakuan, alias Prince Bujangga Manik or Prince Ameng Layaran, visited all of the sacred Hindu sites in Java island and Bali island at the end of the 15th century AD. Using palm leaves, he described his travels in archaic Sundanese. His palm manuscript was taken to England by an Englishman and put at the Bodleian Library, Oxford, in 1627.

After a long journey, Bujangga Manik arrived in the current Bandung city area. He is the first eyewitness to report on the area. Below is a transcription of his report:

Leumpang aing ka baratkeun (I walked forward to the west)
datang ka Bukit Paténggéng (arriving at Mount Patenggeng)
Sakakala Sang Kuriang (where the legend of Sang Kuriang is)
Masa dék nyitu Ci tarum (in which he would dam Citarum River)
Burung tembey kasiangan (he failed because a new day came)

== Summary ==
=== Condemned deities ===
According to the legend, once upon a time in Svargaloka, a pair of deities, a god and a goddess committed a terrible sin. As punishment, Batari Sunan Ambu (the highest mother goddess also the queen of heaven in Sundanese mythology) banished them from Svargaloka and incarnated them on earth as animals—the god became a dog named Tumang, while the goddess became a boar named Celeng Wayungyang. One day a Sundanese king went to a jungle to hunt but got lost and separated from his guard. The king urinated upon the bushes and his urine was accidentally collected in a dried coconut shell. The Celeng Wayungyang, which happened to be in the vicinity, drank the king's urine to quench her thirst. Unbeknownst to her, the urine she had drunk contained a bit of his sperm, and that subsequently impregnated Celeng Wayungyang. Being an animal demigod, she became instantly pregnant and bore a child just hours later. The king, who was still in the jungle, heard the baby crying and found her lying among the bushes. He took her back to his kingdom, adopted and raised her as his daughter, never realising that she was his real daughter.

=== Dayang Sumbi's Curse ===
The baby girl grew up to be a beautiful girl named Dayang Sumbi and many nobles and princes tried to court her but none caught her interest. Her favourite thing to do was weaving and she spent most of her time creating numerous beautiful clothes and textiles. She usually did her weaving in a section of the palace with an elevated pavilion in the garden. Then, one day the terompong (bamboo or wooden cylinder to spin the threads) fell out and into the grounds outside the palace. As she was of nobility, she was forbidden to leave the palace on foot and was always carried around but without anyone near to help her, she grew anxious to retrieve her terompong. In her anxiety, she made a promise out loud "whoever picks the terompong for me will be rewarded, if she is a female, I will treat her as close as my sister, and if he is a male I shall marry him." Suddenly Tumang, the dog god came out of nowhere and retrieved the terompong for her. Princess Dayang Sumbi felt obliged to fulfill her promise and married him anyway despite Tumang being a dog. Naturally, the union caused an uproar and ensuing scandal in the palace. The king was utterly ashamed and embarrassed by the actions of his daughter and banished the princess into the woods. Feeling sorry for their princess, the king's subjects built her a modest cottage in the forest and left her alone with Tumang. She soon discovered that Tumang is a supernatural being and during the full moon, was able to transform back into his original form; as a handsome god. Dayang Sumbi lived in a daze for a while, thinking that it was a strange dream that once a month, a handsome man appeared to her and they made passionate love. They had sex and fell passionately in love, after which Dayang Sumbi subsequently was impregnated and bore Si Tumang's child. That child was named Sangkuriang.

Sangkuriang grew up to be an active and strong boy. Then, around the time he was 10 years old, his mother came to him with her craving for deer liver and asked him to get one for her. Sangkuriang went for a hunt, accompanied by his dog, Tumang, which Sangkuriang still didn't know, was his father. Curiously, there was neither a game animal nor a deer in the woods when Sangkuriang suddenly spotted a wild boar (the boar which is Celeng Wayungyang, his grandmother). He gave chase and tried to shoot her with his arrow but was stopped by Tumang, who had realised that the boar was Sangkuriang's grandmother. Wayungyang managed to escape and this angered Sangkuriang who took it out on Tumang and then accidentally hurt Tumang. Tumang died from his injuries and this further devastated Sangkuriang, who now had to come home empty-handed to his mother. So, he cuts Tumang up and took his liver out to bring it back home to his mother. Upon his death, Tumang's soul returned to the Svargaloka as the deity he was since he had lived out his punishment as a dog on earth.

Sangkuriang returned home to his mother with the promised meat and she unsuspectingly cooked it. After the meal, Dayang Sumbi asked Sangkuriang to summon Tumang to give him his share of the cooked liver. Feeling immense shame and guilt at the realisation that he had killed his good friend, Sangkuriang confesses that the liver they had just eaten was Tumang's. Outraged and horrified, Dayang Sumbi hits Sangkuriang on the head with a centong (rice scoop spoon) so hard that Sangkuriang bled. Sangkuriang had never seen his mother so angry and her horror at his actions shocked him so much that he ran out of the house into the woods. Convinced that his mother hates him for killing Tumang, Sangkuriang decides not to return home and seeks to live a life for himself in the woods. By now, Dayang Sumbi has calmed down but fails to track Sangkuriang down in the woods. In her distress, she prayed to the gods to reunite her with her son someday.

=== The reunion and impossible task ===
Sangkuriang suffered amnesia as a result of being hit in the head by his mother and slowly lost all memory of her. After running away from home, he met a powerful wise hermit who adopted him and taught him pencak silat (martial arts) as well as supernatural skills to control the guriang, a type of hyang spirit. Sangkuriang grew up to be a handsome, strong man who puts his strength to good use by helping villagers in their fights against bandits and other troublemakers. Despite his carefree life, fate intervenes when he sees a beautiful girl in front of a small cottage on his way home through the forest. They started chatting and then spent more and more time together, eventually falling in love and making plans to marry. Never once did Sangkuriang recognised the cottage to be his childhood home and the beautiful girl to be his mother.

One day before the planned wedding, Dayang Sumbi was brushing Sangkuriang's hair when she recognised a scar on Sangkuriang's head. All the pieces fell together and she suddenly realized that she had fallen in love with her son who had left her 12 years previously. Horrified, she knew immediately she could not marry her son and revealed the whole truth to Sangkuriang and begged him to call off the wedding. But Sangkuriang did not believe her and insisted on going through with the wedding. Dayang Sumbi tried to further discourage Sangkuriang by presenting what she thought would be some impossible tasks for Sangkuriang to do as her conditions to marry him. First, Sangkuriang had to build her a great lake by filling the whole valley with water and then she asked for a boat so both of them could sail in it into the lake. The catch was that both tasks had to be completed in one night. Sangkuriang accepted the challenge and with the help of some guriangs (heavenly spirits or gods in ancient Sundanese belief), he dammed the Citarum River with landslides. The river's water rose and filled the plain, transforming it into a lake. Then, Sangkuriang completed his second part of Dayang Sumbi's conditions by cutting down a massive tree to make a boat.

When dawn broke, Sangkuriang had almost completed building the boat and this mortified Dayang Sumbi who had been convinced that he would fail. Refusing to give up, she made a final great prayer call to God for help. She wove her magic shawl and filled the eastern horizon with flashes of light. Deceived by what appeared to be dawn, cocks crowed and farmers rose for a new day.

=== The origin of Mount Tangkuban Parahu ===
Sangkuriang thought that he had failed. In his anger, he kicked the boat that he had built and it fell, turning upside down, transformed it into Mount Tangkuban Parahu (in Sundanese, "tangkuban" means "upturned" or "upside down", and "parahu" means "boat.") The wood left over from the boat became Mt. Burangrang, the rest of the huge tree became Mount Bukit Tunggul and the lake became Lake Bandung (lit. "dam"). Sangkuriang was now frustrated but he still refused to give up on Dayang Sumbi. In his despair, he tried to force himself on Dayang Sumbi but she managed to break free and ran away from him. Sangkuriang gave chase and when he almost caught up with her at Gunung Putri, Dayang Sumbi begged The Almighty to help her one last time. In response, she was transformed into a Jaksi flower and as a result, Sangkuriang failed to find her in his search throughout the jungles and went insane.

Centuries later, this tale lives on as a local legend on how the Lake Bandung and Mount Tangkuban Parahu were created. Under a strong influence of spirits, ghosts and gods, geologic facts were woven together into a tale which has become a legend in those parts of Indonesia and which has been passed down from generation to generation. It has become intertwined with the lives of its inhabitants and the place itself.

== Relevance with geological fact ==
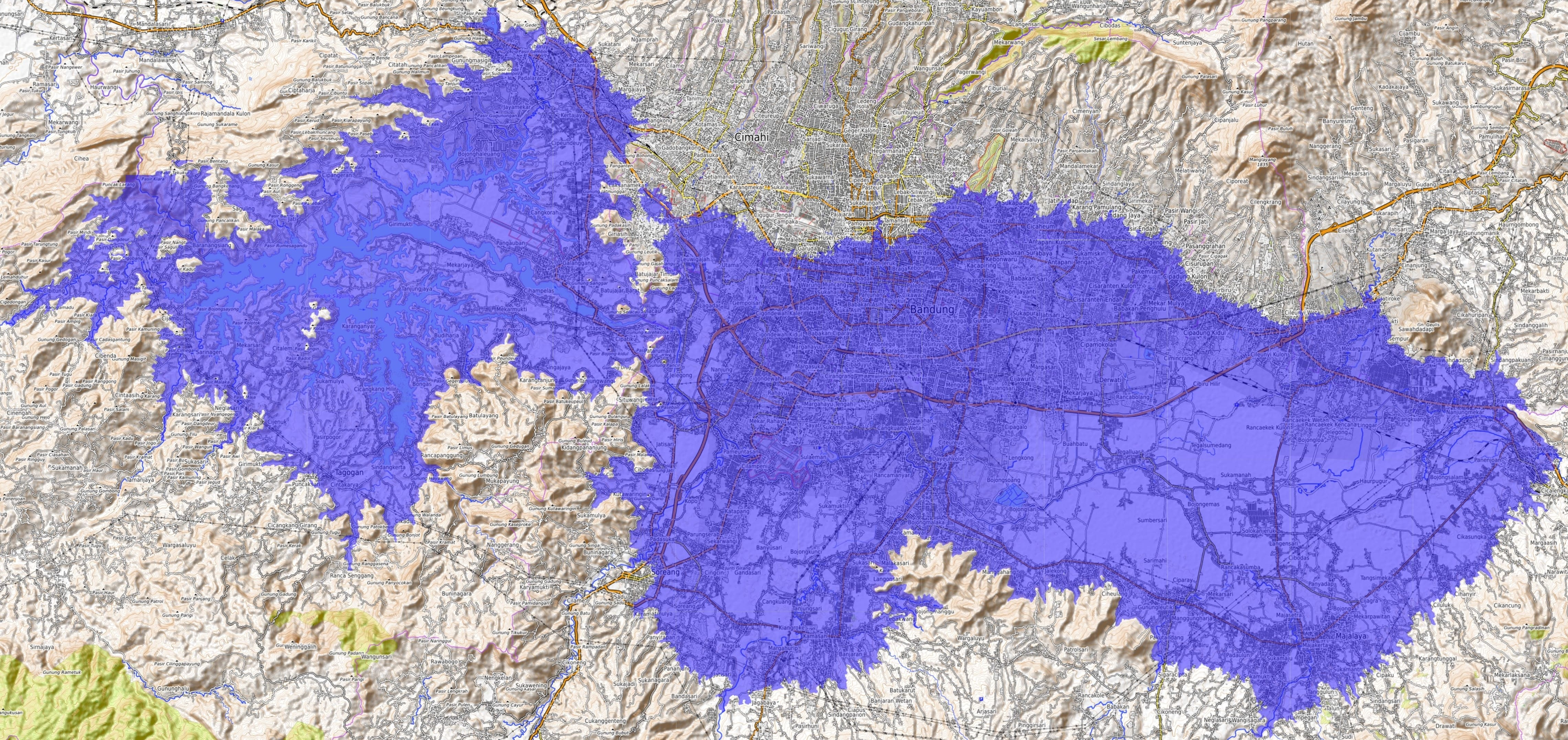
Approximate extent of Lake Bandung.

The story has relevance with the creation of Bandung basin and Mount Tangkuban Parahu.

Recent geological investigations indicate that the oldest lake deposits has been radiometrically dated as old as 125 thousand years. The lake ceased to exist at 16,000 Before present (BP).

There had been two Plinian type of eruptions of ancient Mount Sunda dated respectively at 105,000 and 55,000–50,000 BP. The second plinian eruption has caused ancient Gunung Sunda's caldera to collapse and create mount Tangkuban Parahu, Mount Burangrang (Mount Sunda), and Mount Bukit Tunggul.

It is more likely that the ancient Sundanese have lived in the Bandung area long before 16,000 years BP and witnessed the second Plinian eruption which wiped out settlements west of the Cikapundung river (north and northwest of Bandung) during the 55,000–50,000 eruption period when Mount Tangkuban Parahu was created from the remnants of ancient Mount Sunda. This era was the era of homo sapiens; they have been identified in South Australia as old as 62,000 BP, while on Java the Wajak man has been dated about 50,000 BP.

== Sundanese philosophy of Sangkuriang ==
The legend of Sangkuriang contains a philosophy enlightening (Sungging Perbangkara or sun) for anyone (plant Cariang) who is still doubt of his existence and wants to search his humanity identity / spirit (Wayungyang). The result of this search will bear enlightened consciousness (nurani) as real truth (Dayang Sumbi, Rarasati). But if the search was not accompanied by carefulness and awareness (toropong or binocular), then he will be mastered by continuing anxiety (mastered by Tumang) which will bear egos, that is, the soul which has not been enlightened (Sangkuriang). When the conscience annoyed again by the anxiety (Dayang Sumbi ate the heart of the Tumang) then the real awareness will lose. The compunction of the conscience is wreaked by beating arrogance of Ego Ratio (the head of Sangkuriang is beaten). The arrogance also force the Ego Ratio to leave the conscience. And the arrogance of the Ego Ratio which despairingly seeks for science (intellectual intelligence) during its adventure in the world (eastward). At the end, the Ego Ratio returns westward consciously or unconscious seek for the conscience (the meeting of Sangkuriang and Dayang Sumbi).
