= Valley of the Shadow of Death =

Valley of the Shadow of Death may refer to:

- A phrase as translated into English in the King James Bible version of Psalm 23
- The Valley of the Shadow of Death, as described in The Pilgrim's Progress by poet John Bunyan
- The Valley of the Shadow of Death, a 2005 album by The Tossers
- "Valley of the Shadow of Death", a 1978 single by Throbbing Gristle from D.o.A: The Third and Final Report of Throbbing Gristle
- Valley of the Shadow of Death, an 1855 war photograph by Roger Fenton during the Crimean War
- "The Valley of the Shadow of Death", alluded to in Narrative of the Life of Frederick Douglass

== See also ==
- "In the Shadow of the Valley of Death", a song by Marilyn Manson from Holy Wood (In the Shadow of the Valley of Death)
- Valley of the Shadow (disambiguation)
- Valley of the Shadows
- Valley of Death (disambiguation)
