= Greater Sunda Islands =

Group of four islands in Indonesian Archipelago

Native name: Kepulauan Sunda Besar
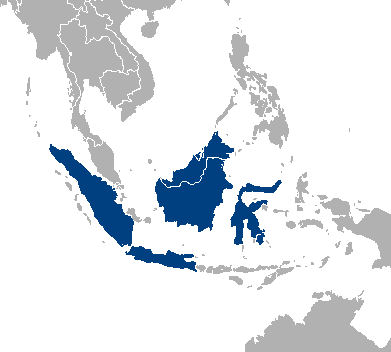
- The Greater Sunda Islands in blue

Geography
- Location: Maritime Southeast Asia
- Coordinates: 0°00′N 110°00′E
- Archipelago: Greater Sunda Islands
- Total islands: 4
- Major islands: Sumatra, Sulawesi, Borneo, Java (sometimes the smaller islands of Madura, Bangka, Belitung, Banggai Islands, and Riau Islands are also included administratively)
- Highest elevation: 4,095 m (13435 ft)
- Highest point: Mount Kinabalu

Administration
- Brunei
- Districts: Temburong; Tutong; Belait; Brunei-Muara
- Indonesia
- Provinces: Aceh; North Sumatra; West Sumatra; Riau; Jambi; Bengkulu; South Sumatra; Lampung; Banten; Jakarta; West Java; Central Java; Yogyakarta; East Java; West Kalimantan; Central Kalimantan; North Kalimantan; East Kalimantan; South Kalimantan; South Sulawesi; Central Sulawesi; West Sulawesi; Southeast Sulawesi; Gorontalo; North Sulawesi
- Malaysia
- States and Federal Territories: Sarawak; Sabah; Labuan

Demographics
- Population: 253 million (2020)
- Ethnic groups: Javanese, Sundanese, Malay, Minangkabau, Dayak, Banjarese other Indonesians and Austronesians

The Greater Sunda Islands (Indonesian and Malay: Kepulauan Sunda Besar) are four tropical islands situated within the Indonesian Archipelago, in the Pacific Ocean. The islands, Borneo, Java, Sulawesi and Sumatra, are internationally recognised for their ecological diversity and rich culture. Together with the Lesser Sunda Islands to their southeast, they all together comprise the archipelago known as the Sunda Islands.

Mainly part of Indonesia, each island is diverse in its ethnicity, culture and biological attributes. The islands have a long and rich history which has shaped their cultural backgrounds.

== Etymology ==
The term "Sunda" has been traced back to ancient times. According to Koesoemadinata, Professor Emeritus of Geology at the Bandung Institute of Technology (ITB), the name "Sunda" originates from the Sundanese word sunda, ultimately from the Sanskrit word śuddha, meaning "clean, clear" and by extension also "white". Reinout Willem van Bemmelen, another geologist, noted that during the Pleistocene era, there was a large volcano named Mount Sunda located north of Bandung in West Java. Its eruption covered the surrounding area with white volcanic ash, giving rise to the name "Sunda."

The use of the term "Sunda" to refer to the Indonesian region dates back to the exploration report of the geographer Claudius Ptolemaeus in 150 AD. This report served as a reference for the Portuguese when they arrived in Indonesia in 1500 AD and explored the Sunda kingdom. They categorized the region into Greater Sunda (Sunda Besar) for the larger western islands and Lesser Sunda (Sunda Kecil) for the smaller eastern islands.

Since then, the term "Sunda" has been widely adopted in earth sciences (geology-geography) as a reference for the Indonesian region, surpassing the usage of "Indonesia" in this field. The terms Greater Sunda and Lesser Sunda are commonly used in geological-geographical literature. According to Koesoemadinata, even today, in earth sciences, "Sunda Islands" is more recognized than "Indonesia Islands."

"Sunda" also denotes continental shelves or landmasses. Indonesia itself has two shelves: the Sunda Shelf in the west and the Sahul/Arafuru Shelf in the east. Other terms associated with "Sunda" include the Sunda Island Arc or the arc of Sunda Islands, Sunda Fold or tectonic folding in the Natuna Sea, the Sunda Trench, and Sundaland.

== Sumatra ==
=== Geography ===
Sumatra is the second largest, most westerly oriented Indonesian island, and the sixth largest island globally. Spanning 473,481 square kilometres (182,812 sq mi), Sumatra is home to human civilisations and tropical rainforests, which harbour a huge range of wildlife. Its close proximity to the Equator (1º S, 101º E) dictates its tropical climate, so that it is subject to the forces of climatic events El Niño and La Niña.

Sumatra is divided administratively into twelve major regions. These regions were developed during World War II, to sustain functional political, economic and cultural relationships across the island. Each region supports itself based on the unique resources abundant in their location, trading with other regions; hence, the stable relationship between each regions is significantly influenced by their geographical location. For instance, the Insular Riau region is situated along the central coast of Sumatra, and thus has a strong relationship with fishing, seafare and marine operations. This has characterised the transportation and trading aspects of the region; central regions of Sumatra rely on this region to transport ocean foods and marine related goods, while Insular Riau is dependent on the central regions of Sumatra for import of foods and other goods.

=== Demographics ===
Sumatra has about 50 million people (census date 2000), making it the fourth most populated island in the world. There is a diverse range of ethnicities; the most predominant ethnic groups are the Malay, Batak, Minangkabau and Acehnese. Each of these groups has unique traditions and ceremonies, which have been passed on through generations by oral, written, social and artistic communications. Ethnic groups are prominent in political climates and are inherently linked to the religious profile of the island. Currently Sumatra is primarily Islamic (90%), with minority religious groups Christianity (8%) and Buddhism (2%). Links between ethnicity and religion can be demonstrated by the dominance of Malay people in Sumatra. The Malay people are the most dominant ethnic group populating Sumatra. The most vital part of Malay culture is their intrinsic connection to Islam; adhering to Islam is directly linked to the Malay identity and an individual can identify as Malay only if they adhere to Islam. Hence, individuals who belong to other religions identify as ethnic minorities.

The main dialect of Indonesian spoken in Sumatra is Gayo. Gayo is a living language used by inhabitants of the central highlands of Aceh, which is located at the northern tip of Sumatra. The Gayo people have an estimated population of 4,000,000 people, and are the second largest ethnic group in the Aceh province. Various other provinces within Sumatra have their own unique dialects.

Agriculture is the most prevalent occupation throughout Sumatra, covering 80% of the population.

=== Landmarks ===
Sumatra is recognised for its natural wonders, including Mount Leuser National Park, Lake Maninjau and Mount Sibayak.

=== Biodiversity ===
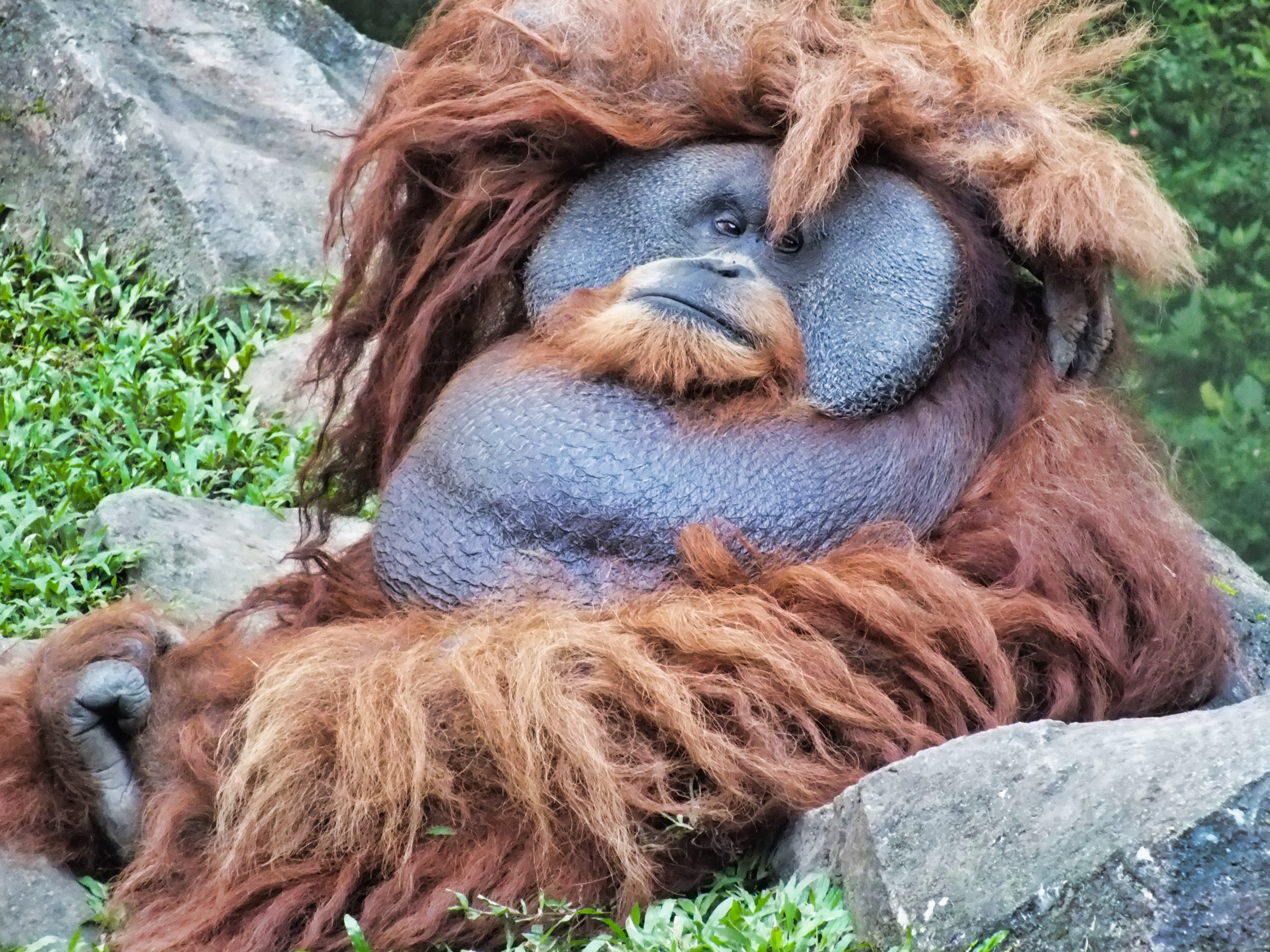
A Sumatran male orangutan

The forests of Sumatra are a biological hotspot, with countless endemic and paleoendemic species. There are over 200 species of mammals and more than 600 bird species, with new species continually being discovered. Sumatra is also home to critically endangered species, including the Sumatran tiger and Sumatran rhino.

Sumatra has numerous flora species which constitute its vast forests and mangrove systems. There are 17 mangrove species and more than 20 plant communities located across all of Sumatra. These forests have a complex pollination system, in which plants rely on bats, birds, insects and numerous other pollinator species to disperse the plant species.

Sumatra's natural resources are highly sought after. The forests have been subject to logging and deforestation for industrial developments, but most prominently palm oil and acacia plantations. This has led to a significant degradation of the forests. In 1985, Sumatra was covered in 25 million hectares of forests, 53% of the island, compared to only 11% in 2016. Poaching and the illegal wildlife trade have also made Sumatra's wildlife extremely vulnerable.

== Sulawesi ==
=== Geography ===
Sulawesi is the 11th largest island in the world, nestled between Borneo and the Maluku islands. Home to 11 active volcanoes, these geological phenomena can have a profound effect on the communities living in Sulawesi. Sulawesi is also prone to major earthquakes. These natural disasters are due to Sulawesi's geographical location and close proximity to the equator and tectonic plates.

As of 1960, the island was split into two administrative regions in attempts to have greater economic and social control of the regions. These areas were distinguished by the North and South regions of Sulawesi. North Sulawesi is extremely mountainous and home to the majority of volcanoes found on the island. South Sulawesi features more coastal features, such as coral reef systems and streams. However, in 1964, Sulawesi was divided further down to four provinces. These are now identified as North Sulawesi, Central Sulawesi, Southeast Sulawesi and South Sulawesi.

=== Demographics ===
Sulawesi is the least populated island of the Greater Sundas. With a population of approximately 15 million (census date 2000), it accounts for only 8% of Indonesia's entire population. The population can be generally divided into two regions. A large group populate the South of Sulawesi, which is characterised by valleys and plains which have nutrient dense soils that are ideal for agriculture and living off the land. The other half of the large group lives in the North-East, within the Manado and Minahasa regions. Each of these regions populations are distinguished by their unique ethnic groups. The Buginese is the most prominent ethnic group, with approximately 3.5 million people. The Makassarese account for 1.5 million people, the Mandarese have 0.5 million people. Other primary ethnic groups include the Butonese, Toraja and Kahumanoan peoples. There are approximately 114 language dialects throughout Sulawesi, which culminate to form a branch of a Malayo-Polynesian language family. Each region and ethnicity generally has its own unique dialects and languages, some having multiple languages learnt to communicate with a range of different individuals and provinces.

Across all ethnic groups, Islam is the most prevalent religion adhered to on the island, with approximately 80% of the population being Muslim. Specifically, Islam has been the predominant religion on Sulawesi since the 17th century. Christianity accounts for the majority of the rest of the religious profile, being more prominent throughout North Sulawesi. However, it can be assumed that the majority of Christians of the island are immigrants, as Islam has been ingrained into Sulawesi culture since its arrival in the 17th century.

Sulawesi is heavily involved in agriculture, with the majority of Sulawesi people participating in agriculture as their primary source of income and way of life. Rice, sugarcane, coconut and coffee are the main crops farmed in Sulawesi. Sulawesi is able to contribute to the Republic of Indonesia's income by exporting these products internationally. Additionally, below the nutrient dense soils are nickel and iron, which are beginning to be mined for further trading.

=== Landmarks ===
Notable landmarks include Mount Mahawu, Tangkoko Batuangus Nature Reserve and Fort Rotterdam in Makassar.

=== Biodiversity ===
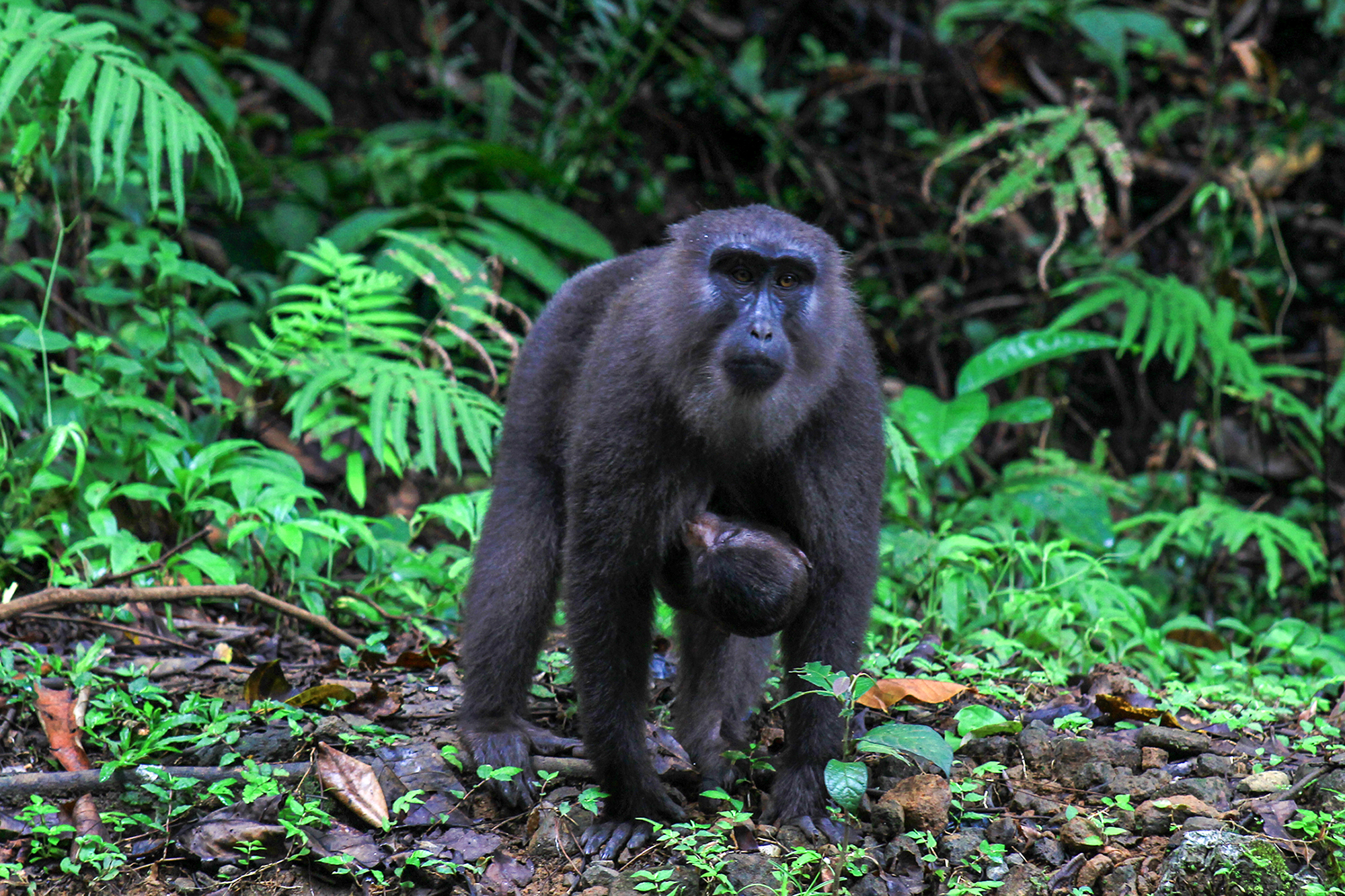
A Moor macaque and her young, endemic to southwestern Sulawesi.

Sulawesi is a hot-spot for endemic fauna and flora. There are 127 endemic mammals, featuring 59 bird species and 17 endemic primates which can be divided into two genera. The composition of this fauna is also unique in comparison to the other Greater Sunda Islands, in that there are fewer biological families represented and these families have distinct morphological traits and adaptations. It is predicted that there are numerous organisms unique to Sulawesi that are yet to be discovered.

Sulawesi also has over 1,500 endemic plant species, which highlights the uniqueness of their ecosystems.

Deforestation has had a significant effect on the fauna which inhabit the island. The niche habitat of Sulawesi means that the animals which inhabit the land are adapted to the specific environmental conditions, as well as to a unique diet. Between 2000 and 2017, 2.07 million hectares of forest was destroyed. This equates to 10.90% of the total forest destroyed, averaging out to a loss of 0.65% of the forest cleared annually. This has had particular impact on the primate species of Sulawesi. The primates found on Sulawesi account for a third of all primates within Indonesia. Studies have shown that the two genera of primates that occupy Sulawesi, the Macaques and Tarsius, breed and thrive in specific areas across the island. There has been a 12% loss of these breeding and contact zones as a result of land clearing, which has directly impacted the primates population. There is concern that as the land continues to be cleared for agricultural purposes, many more species will be impacted and there will be a dramatic loss of overall biodiversity in Sulawesi.

== Borneo ==
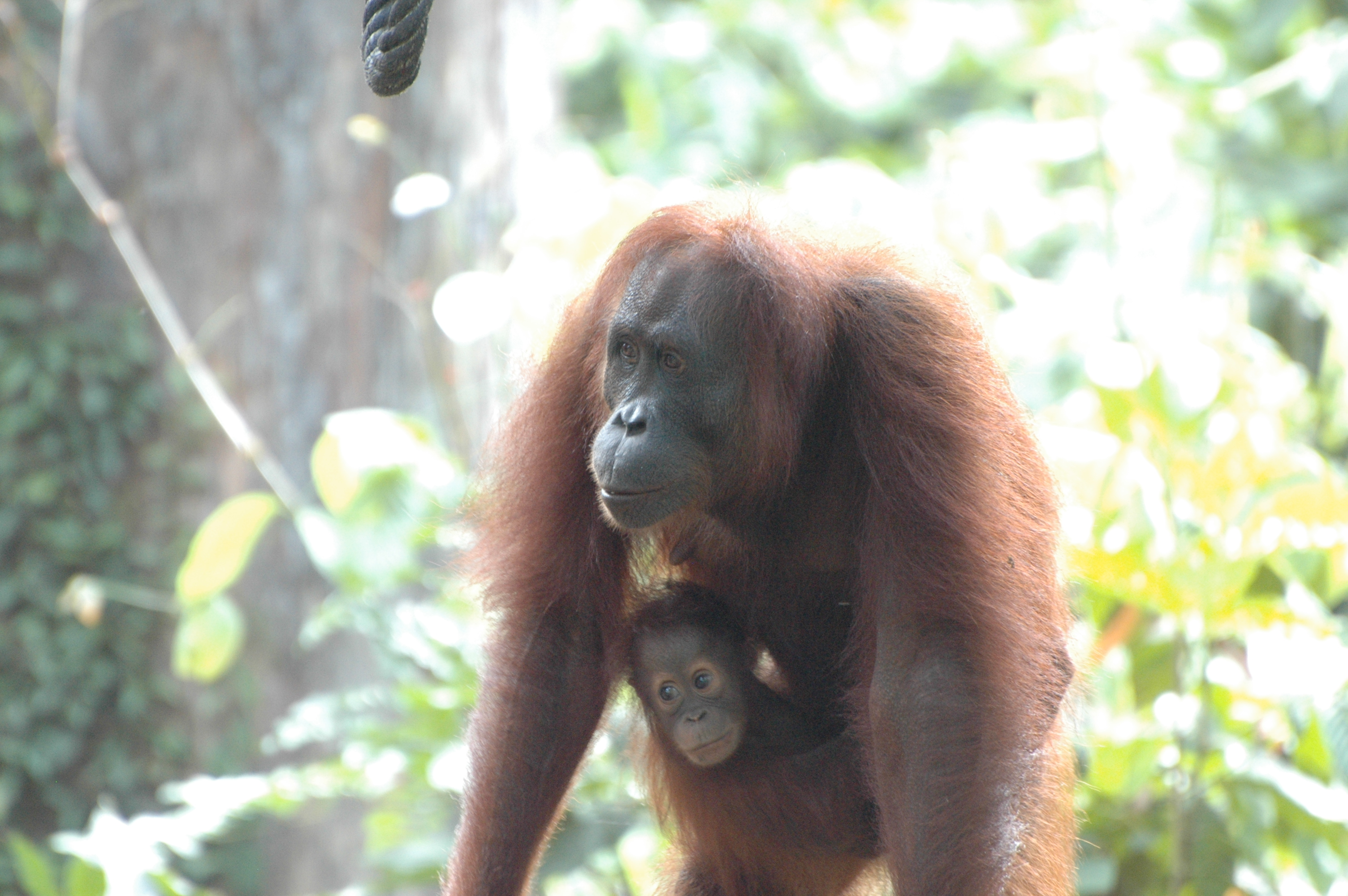
Mother and infant Borneo orangutans

=== Geography ===
Borneo is the largest Indonesian island, as well as the third largest island in the world. Expanding across 75 million hectares, the island is geographically and ecologically diverse. There are three main geographical regions: tropical rainforests, coastal areas and river basins. Tropical rainforests are situated centrally, where inland they are surrounded by dense and lush mountain zones. The coastal areas are characterised by mangroves and swamps, often extending across hundreds of kilometres of coastal waters. The river basins lie in between the tropical rainforests and the coastline, acting as a pathway for trade and transport across the island.

Borneo is the northernmost island of the Greater Sundas (1º N, 115º E) Although most of it is part of Indonesia (this part is known as Kalimantan), it also includes parts of Malaysia (Sabah and Sarawak), and all of Brunei Darussalam.

=== Demographics ===
With about 21 million people (census date 2014), there are over 190 ethnicities. A variety of local dialects and languages are spoken; these are unique to certain provinces and cultures. There are over 100 Austronesian languages. Some prominent languages are Bahasa Indonesia, Hakka, Tamil and English. Many other languages draw on Chinese backgrounds and linguistic history.

Trade is a major source of income, with Brunei Darssalam's export of petroleum accounting for 99% of the island's overall income. The production of petroleum has been consistent since the 1920s, and as this production began to flourish Borneo, along with mainland Indonesia and Malaysia, contribute to more than half of the world's production of natural liquid gas.

=== Landmarks ===
Key landmarks of Borneo include the Omar Ali Saifuddien Mosque in Brunei, Niah National Park in Sarawak, Bohey Dulang and the Kota Kinabalu in Sabah.

=== Biodiversity ===
Borneo has many natural wonders; the national parks are home to some of the world's most distinctive species of flora and fauna. These parks include Gunung Mulu National Park and Mount Kinabalu; they are home to endemic, critically endangered species such as the Borneo orangutans, Borneo elephant, and Bornean leaf monkey. In recent years, palm oil plantations have drawn media attention, as the industry has had controversial effects on the native wildlife of Borneo.

Borneo's forests are rich in natural resources, which have contributed substantially to the Indonesian economy. For instance, the camphor tree has been harvested in Borneo for trade, as the oil derived from the wood of the tree is used for some medical treatments. However, the most important recent development has been the expansion of palm oil plantations across the island. To develop these plantations, a large amount of land continues to be cleared. This has had an extreme impact on the animals which inhabit these forests. The orangutan and the elephant have most notably suffered. Poaching and the illegal wildlife trade have also had a pronounced effect on wildlife diversity and conservation in Borneo. As Borneo nurtures such rare wildlife, they are highly desired by illegal wildlife traders. Despite government and charity organisations acting to prevent poachers from targeting such vulnerable animals, this continues to be a prevalent issue which is expected to continue to influence the overall biodiversity of Borneo over time.

== Java ==
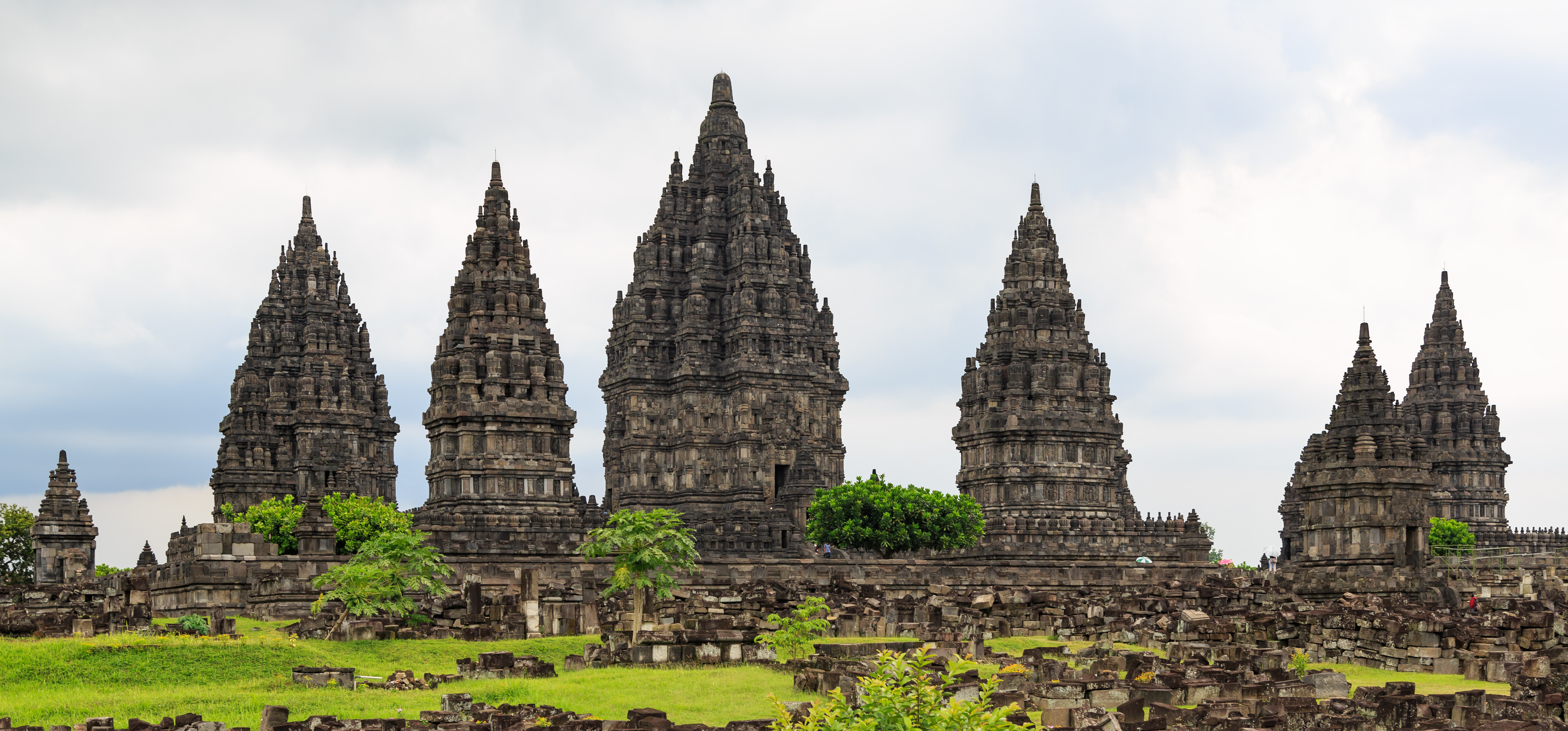
The Prambanan temple located in Java

=== Geography ===
Covering over 13 million hectares, Java is the southernmost island of the Greater Sundas. The majority of the land has been cultivated for human usage; however there are still a range of forests and wild, uninhabited mountainous areas.

=== Demographics ===
Java is Indonesia's most populated island, with approximately 150 million people, constituting roughly 55% of Indonesia's total population. This makes Java one of the most densely populated places in the world. The capital of Java is Jakarta, on the northern coast. The majority of the population is Javanese and Sundanese, however minority groups include Chinese, Arab, Indian and other immigrant groups who have settled on the island.

=== Landmarks ===
Java holds hundreds of years of Indonesian cultural history on its soil. Notable landmarks include Mount Bromo, Prambanan Temple and Borobudur Temple. The Prambanan temple is a Hindu temple which was constructed in the 9th century to honour and worship the Trimurti, the trinity of the Hindu religion. Additionally, the Borobudur Temple is a Mahayana Buddhist temple, being the largest of its kind in the world. It was constructed in the 9th century and is decorated with numerous statues and intricate designs which tribute the Buddhist religion. This provides an insight into the long, diverse and rich religious and cultural history of Java. It pays homage to the traditions of Indonesian culture.

=== Biodiversity ===
Java is extremely biodiverse, with numerous endemic flora and fauna species. These include the Javan rhinoceros, the Javan hawk-eagle and the Javan leopard.

Java has extremely rich land and soil, as it is estimated around 80% of the soil is productive and nutrient dense. It is generally seen that the remaining 20% of the soil is cultivated in human development, for things such as road, buildings and housing.

== See also ==
- Banda Arc
- Lesser Sunda Islands
- List of islands of Indonesia
- Oceanic trench
- Plate tectonics
- Sunda Arc
- Sunda Islands
- Sunda Trench
- Sundaland
