= Death Valley (disambiguation) =

Death Valley is a desert valley in southeastern California in the Mojave Desert.

Death Valley may also refer to:

== Places ==
- Death Valley National Park, a national park in the U.S. states of California and Nevada

Places nicknamed "Death Valley"

- Interstate 40 in North Carolina, a section of Interstate 40 at the split of I-85 Business in Greensboro, North Carolina, which has a high number of deaths due to car crashes
- Link Valley, Houston, a community in Houston, Texas which had high levels of drug-related and violent crime in the 1980s

== Arts, entertainment, and media ==
=== Films ===
- Death Valley, 1927 film directed by Paul Powell
- Death Valley (1946 film), starring Robert Lowery
- Death Valley (1982 film), starring Paul Le Mat
- Death Valley (2021 film), a Canadian science fiction horror film

=== Music ===
- Death Valley Suite (1949), a symphonic suite by Ferde Grofe, inspired by the history and geography of Death Valley
- "Death Valley Nights", a song by American rock band Blue Öyster Cult on their 1977 album Spectres.

=== Television ===
- Death Valley (American TV series), a 2011 MTV horror comedy series
- Death Valley (British TV series), a 2025 BBC crime mystery television series
- Death Valley Days (1930-1945 radio series; 1952–1970 TV series), an American radio and television anthology series featuring stories of the old American West, particularly the Death Valley area

== Structures nicknamed "Death Valley" ==
- Memorial Stadium (Clemson), home of the Clemson University Tigers football team, Clemson, South Carolina
- Tiger Stadium (LSU), home of the Louisiana State University Tigers football team, Baton Rouge, Louisiana
- Yankee Stadium (1923), left-center field of the former stadium in the Bronx, New York City, the wall of which was 399 feet from home plate and difficult to hit a home run over

== See also ==
- Valley of Death (disambiguation)
