= Reinout Willem van Bemmelen =

Dutch geologist (1904–1983)

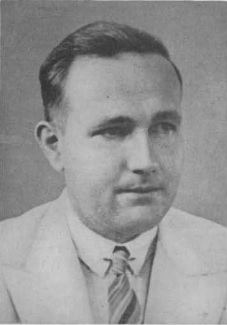
- Reinout Willem van Bemmelen
- Born: 14 April 1904; Batavia, Dutch East Indies
- Died: 19 November 1983 (aged 79); Oberdrauburg (Austria)
- Known for: orogeny
- Awards: Wollaston Medal (1977)
- Scientific career
- Fields: geology

Reinout Willem van Bemmelen, also known as Rein van Bemmelen, (14 April 1904 Batavia, Dutch East Indies – 19 November 1983 Unterpirkach, Austria) was a Dutch geologist whose interests were structural geology, economic geology and volcanology. He is known for his work on these subjects and the geology of Indonesia.

== Biography ==
Rein van Bemmelen was born in Batavia and spent his youth in the Dutch East Indies, where his father Willem van Bemmelen was the director of the Magnetic, Meteorological and Seismological Observatory. From 1920 to 1927 he studied mining engineering at Delft University in the Netherlands. Among his teachers were H.A. Brouwer and G.A.F. Molengraaff. Van Bemmelen became PhD in 1927 with a study on the geology of the Cordillera Bética. He took courses in volcanology at Naples and then worked with the geological survey in the Dutch East Indies, where he mapped parts of Java and Sumatra. From 1933 to 1935 he studied pedology at the Technical University of Vienna. After that he went back to Java to continue his research there. His main interest was in volcanology (magmas and pyroclastic rocks), structural geology and tectonics, especially sliding tectonics.

He was able to observe the 1930s activity of Mount Merapi from the volcanological post at Babadan on the north west slope.

When the Japanese occupied the Dutch East Indies in World War II Van Bemmelen and his wife spent three years in a prisoners camp. He belonged to a small number of professionals who were allowed by the Japanese to continue with their work. It was during that time that he managed to publish the 1941 issue of the Netherlands East Indian Volcanological Survey, which came out in 1943. With the end of the war they moved to the Netherlands, where they lived in The Hague. The Dutch government assigned to Van Bemmelen the job to recollect all information on the geology of the Indonesian Archipelago. (Van Bemmelen had summarized that information in a manuscript destroyed during the war). (The manuscript was entrusted to his assistant who took it to Yogyakarta. When diplomatic relations between the Netherlands and Indonesia were established, the manuscript was returned to him. In the meantime, Van Bemmelen was able to produce a similar document and in 1949 his The Geology of Indonesia was published, just after Indonesia's independence. Van Bemmelen then spent a year as assistant of S.G. Trooster at Utrecht University and then worked for Shell as a consultant.

Van Bemmelen retired in 1969. Geologie en Mijnbouw marked the occasion of his seventieth birthday with a special issue. Following the death of his wife in 1983 he moved to Austria, where he died shortly after. A controversial TV series was made after his death about his role in the euthanasia of his wife.

== Academic career ==
In 1950 Van Bemmelen became a professor at Utrecht University. Together with M.G. Rutten he started research on the volcanology and paleomagnetism of Iceland. He supervised seven doctoral dissertations on the tectonics of the Italian Alps and several dissertations on hydrology (his chair was Economic Geology).

Van Bemmelen is known for his explanation of orogeny. In his book Mountain Building he postulated his Undation Theory. The mechanism behind orogeny was, according to Van Bemmelen, in the mantle. Due to geochemical differentiation slight differences in density would lead to vertical flow in the mantle, resulting in orogeny. These ideas had to be adjusted with plate tectonics as the mechanism of orogeny. In 1972 Van Bemmelen's book Geodynamic Models the Undation Theory was integrated in plate tectonics.

== Published works ==
- van Bemmelen, R. W. (Reinout Willem) The Geology of Indonesia. The Hague: Government Printing Office; Martinus Nijhoff, 1949. 2 volumes
