= Death Valley (2021 film) =

- Directed by: Matthew Ninaber
- Written by: Matthew Ninaber
- Produced by: Chad Archibald; Cody Calahan; Matthew Ninaber
- Starring: Jeremy Ninaber; Ethan Mitchell; Kristen Kaster; Matthew Ninaber
- Cinematography: Brent Tremain
- Edited by: Matthew Ninaber
- Music by: Sean Croley
- Production companies: Black Fawn Films; Breakthrough Entertainment; High Rise Studio
- Distributed by: Breakthrough Entertainment; Epic Pictures
- Release dates: 18 November 2021 (Canada, Poland, Russia); 9 December 2021 (Australia, Ireland, New Zealand, United Kingdom & United States)
- Running time: 91 minutes
- Country: Canada
- Language: English
- Box office: $27,372

Death Valley is a 2021 Canadian science fiction horror directed by Matthew Ninaber, starring Jeremy Ninaber, Ethan Mitchell and Kristen Kaster.

== Plot ==
Mercenaries with nothing to lose are hired to rescue a bioengineer, imprisoned in a Cold War bunker. Upon entering the ominous facility, they find themselves in a fight for their lives when they come under attack from an unknown and deadly creature.

== Cast ==
- Jeremy Ninaber as James Beckett
- Ethan Mitchell as Marshall
- Kristen Kaster as Chloe
- Matthew Ninaber as Monster / Service Man
- Matt Daciw as Olek Volkov
- Jacqueline Ninaber as Rachel
- Jonah Fortin as Jonah Petrov
- Melissa Joy Boerger as Jessica
- Justin Moses as Moses
- Jeff Waters as Preacher
- Jacob Fortin as Militia Boy
- Connor Mitchell as Flight Crew
- Jeremy Dueck as Cadaver
- Tyler Garton as Flame Thrower
- Mike Ninaber as Russian Man
- Dan Siswanto as X. Cheng
- Shemora Davy as Alpha 2
- Brent Tremain as Infected Man

== Release ==
The film was released on Shudder on 9 December 2021.

== Reception ==
Phil Hoad of The Guardian rated the film 3 stars out of 5 and wrote, "Death Valley is never fully disturbing, but enjoyably gross is good enough."

Michael Pementel of Bloody Disgusting gave the film a score of 3/5 and wrote, "In its riveting suspense and great science-fiction horror atmosphere, Death Valley is a wild time you don’t want to miss out on."

Matt Donato of Paste gave the film a score of 5/10 and wrote that the film "isn’t memorable as a smash-and-grab, almost Doom-like standoff against undead biters", and that "There’s nothing narratively unique between Beckett’s one last hurrah before fatherhood, or humankind’s hubris, or the tightly-shirted Eastern European madmen we’ve seen hold innocents at gunpoint eleventy times before."
