= Valley of the Shadow (disambiguation) =

"Valley of the Shadow" is a 1963 episode of The Twilight Zone.

The Valley of the Shadow may also refer to:

- The Valley of the Shadow, a digital history project about the American Civil War
- "The Valley of the Shadow" (Kipling story), a short story by Rudyard Kipling in Soldiers Three (1888)
- "Valley of the Shadow" (Dead Zone), a 2003 episode of Dead Zone

== See also ==
- Valley of the Shadows
- Valley of the Shadow of Death (disambiguation)
