= Mount Sunda =

Mountain in Indonesia

Mount Sunda was an ancient volcano that once stood in Priangan highlands in today's West Java province, Java island, Indonesia. The Sunda volcano existed during the Pleistocene age before a violent Plinian eruption caused its summit to collapse. The volcano formed the northern ridge of the Bandung Basin. The ancient volcano is the predecessor of today's Tangkuban Perahu, Burangrang, and Bukit Tunggul volcanoes.

The Sunda volcano was a stratovolcano and is estimated to have reached up to 3,000–4,000 metres (9,850–13,100 ft) above sea level during the Pleistocene age. During this age, it was one of the highest volcanoes in Java. 6°26′S 107°19′E

== Eruptions ==
Two large-scale eruptions took place; the first formed the northern ridge of the Bandung basin, and the other (est. 55,000 Before the Present) blocked the Citarum River, turning the basin into a lake known as the "Great Prehistoric Lake of Bandung".

== Naming ==
The mountain's name comes from the Sanskrit "Chuda" which means white, referring to the mountain's top which was covered in glaciers in the past. The nomads of India from the island of Sumatra can see the mountain clearly from their location. Out of curiosity, they visited the mountain. There, they spread cultures and languages. They refer to the local people as Chuda people. The word Chuda turns into Sunda from local pronunciation. The word Chunda/Sunda can also refer to the light skin of the Sundanese people which lives in the region.

== See also ==
- Toba supervolcano
- Mount Tambora
- Mount Batur
