= Lembang Fault =

Fault in Indonesia

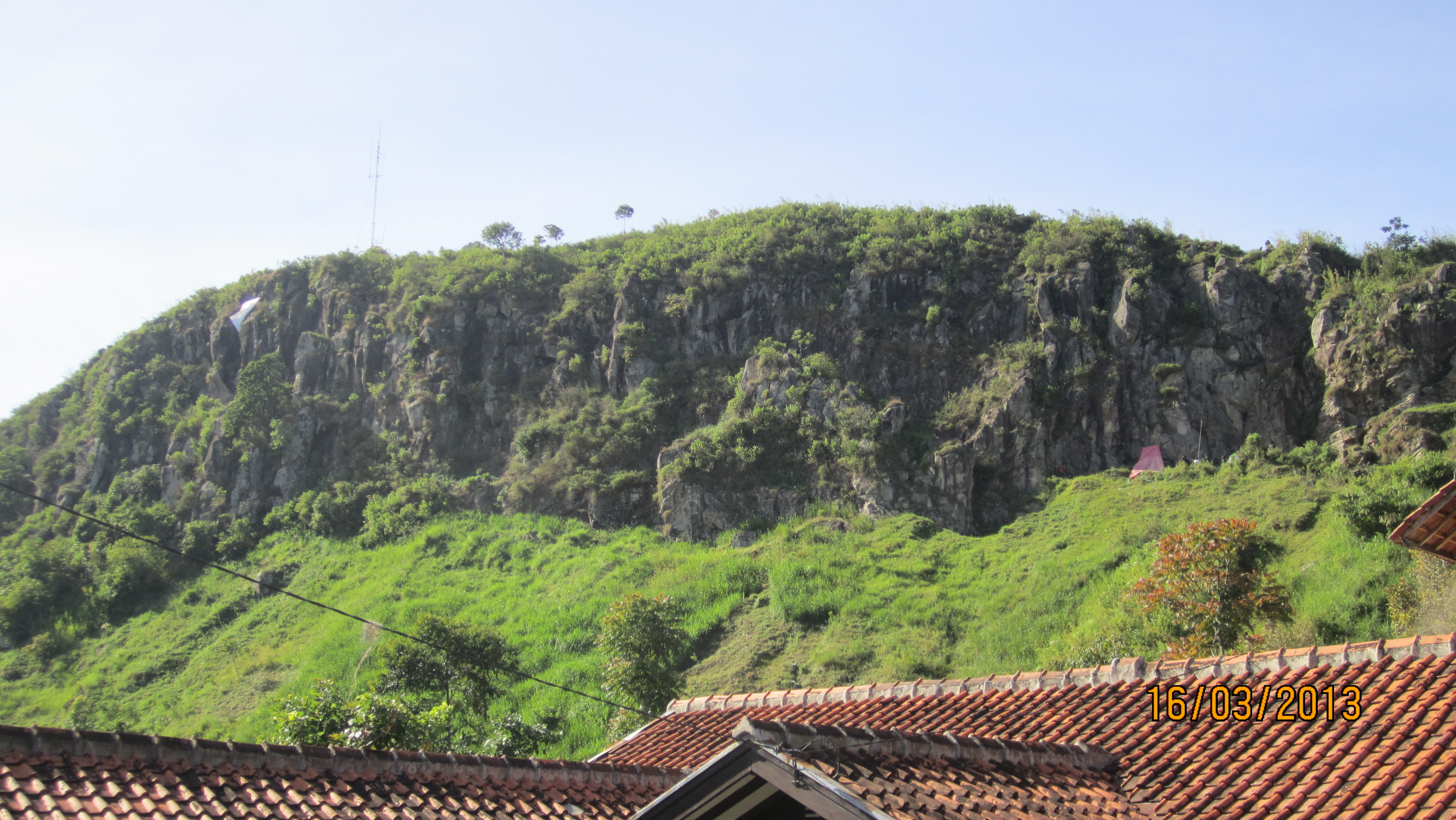
- A fault scarp of the lembang fault
- Country: Indonesia
- Region: West Java
- Cities: Bandung

Characteristics
- Length: 29 km (18 mi)
- Displacement: 1.95–3.45 mm/yr

Tectonics
- Status: active
- Earthquakes: None recorded historically
- Type: crustal
- Movement: right-lateral strike-slip
- Age: Pleistocene

The Lembang Fault (Indonesian: Sesar Lembang) is an active fault located 10 km north of the city of Bandung on the Indonesian island of Java. This sinistral slip fault is estimated to measure 29 km in length. While no historical earthquakes have occurred, the fault is thought to be possible of generating a magnitude (M_{w}) 6.5 to 7.0 earthquake in the future. Because of the potential for large and damaging earthquakes on the fault, the Meteorology, Climatology and Geophysics Agency (BMKG) has been monitoring activity on the fault.

== Activity ==
Paleoseismic trenching along the fault in a 2019 study uncovered three earthquakes in the 15th century, 2300–60 BCE and 19,620–19,140 BP with a recurrence interval of 170 to 670 years.

== Threat ==
The Indonesian Institute of Sciences has urged that the Government of Indonesia educate the residents in nearby population centers about the dangers of a damaging earthquake on the fault.

In 2019, the BMKG said that 22 seismic monitoring devices would be installed around that fault to monitor its activity and detect movements.

Earthquakes can cause IDR 51 Trillion ($3.5 Billion) worth of damage, exceeding that of the 2004 Indian Ocean earthquake and tsunami. It is estimated that around 2.5 million homes would be affected, including one million lightly damaged. Another million others seriously damaged and 500 thousand homes collapsed. An estimated four million would be displaced and 180,000 injured and 80,000 may be killed.
