= Tangkuban Perahu =

Stratovolcano in West Java

Tangkuban Parahu
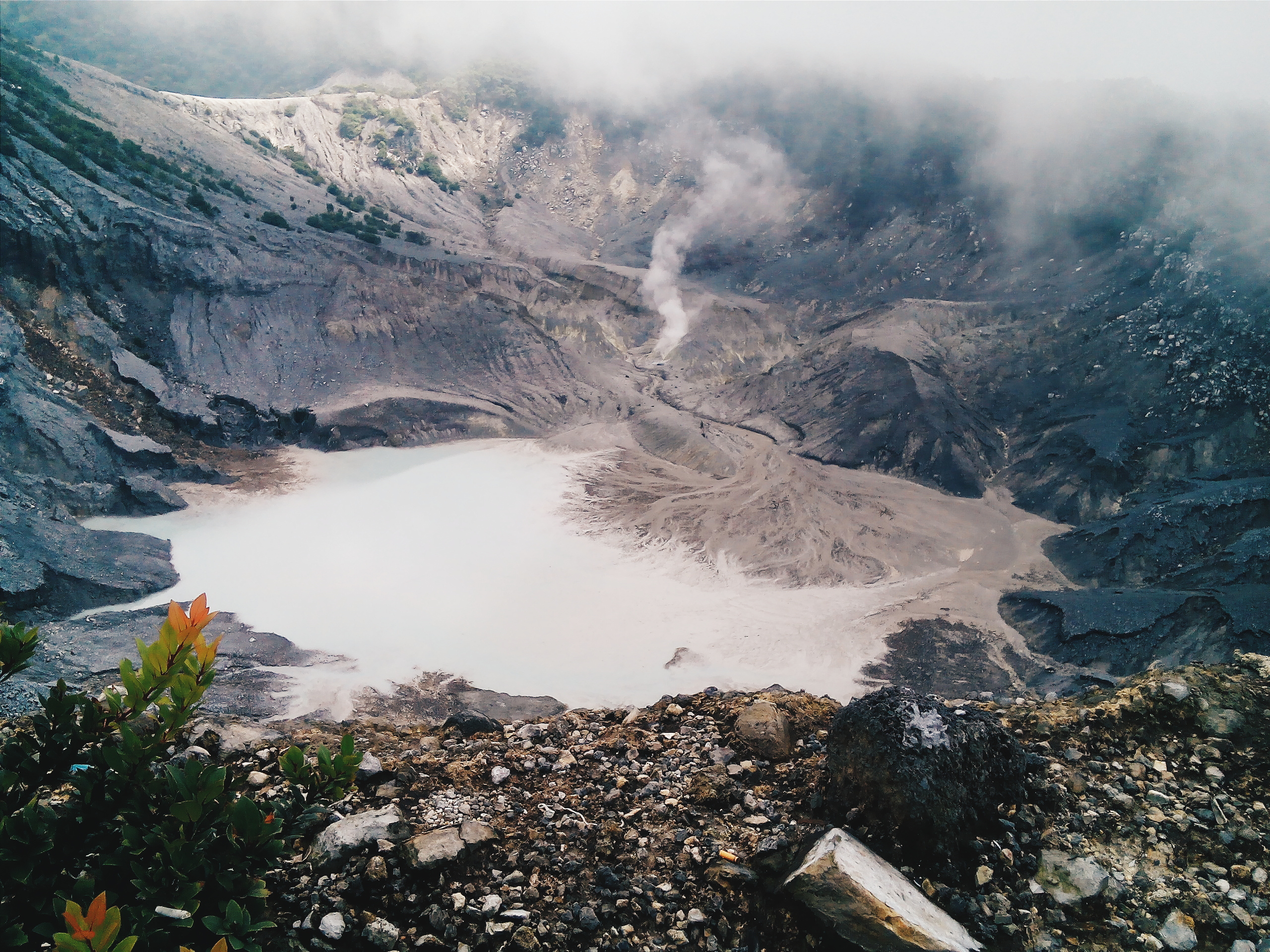
- Tangkuban Perahu viewed in Kawah Ratu, 2016

Highest point
- Elevation: 2,084 m (6,837 ft)
- Listing: Spesial Ribu
- Coordinates: 6°46′S 107°36′E

Geography
- Location within Java
- Location: West Java, Indonesia

Geology
- Mountain type: Stratovolcano
- Volcanic arc: Sunda Arc
- Last eruption: 26 July 2019

Climbing
- First ascent: 1713 by van Riebeeck
- Easiest route: Hike

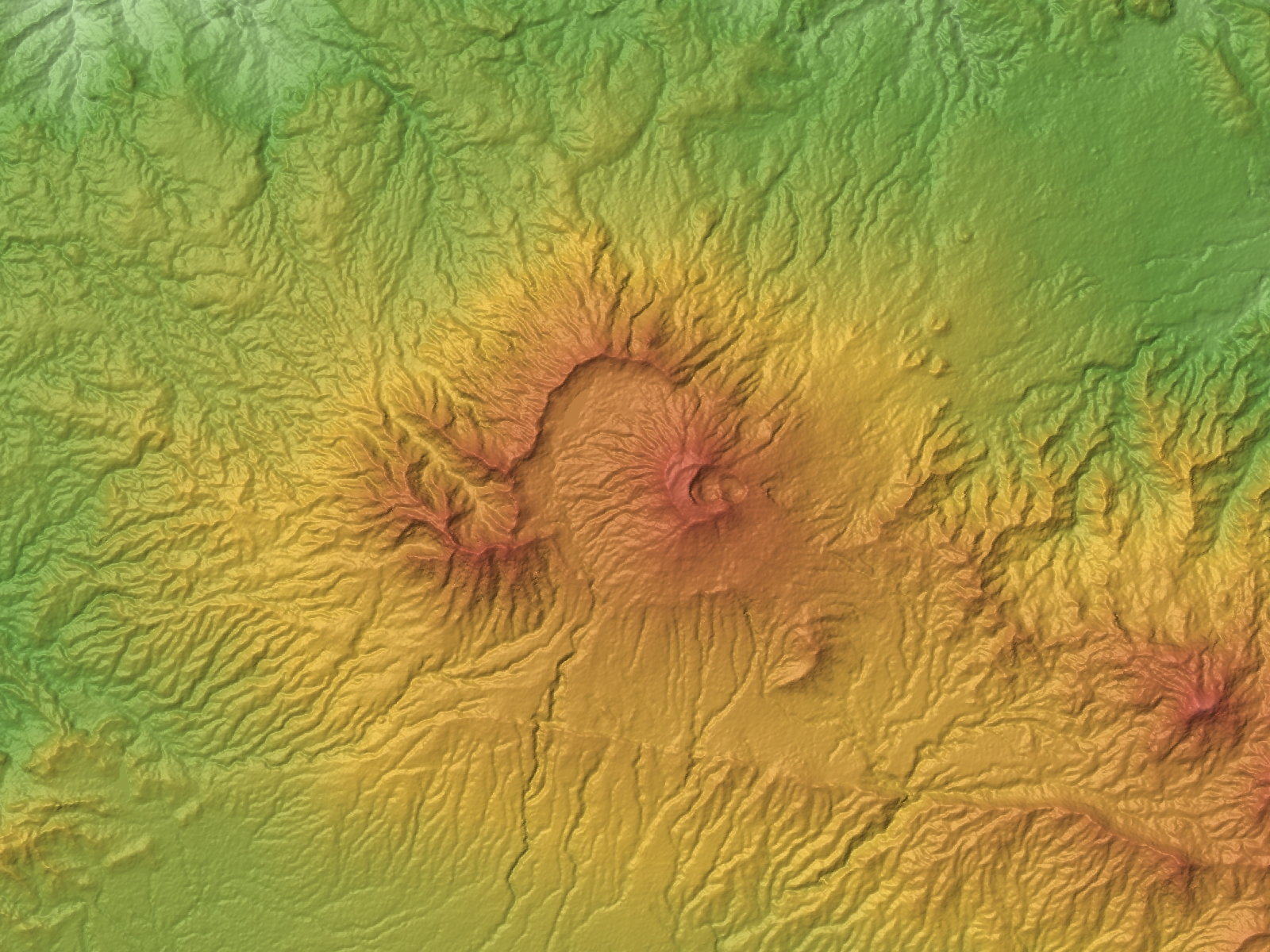
Relief Map

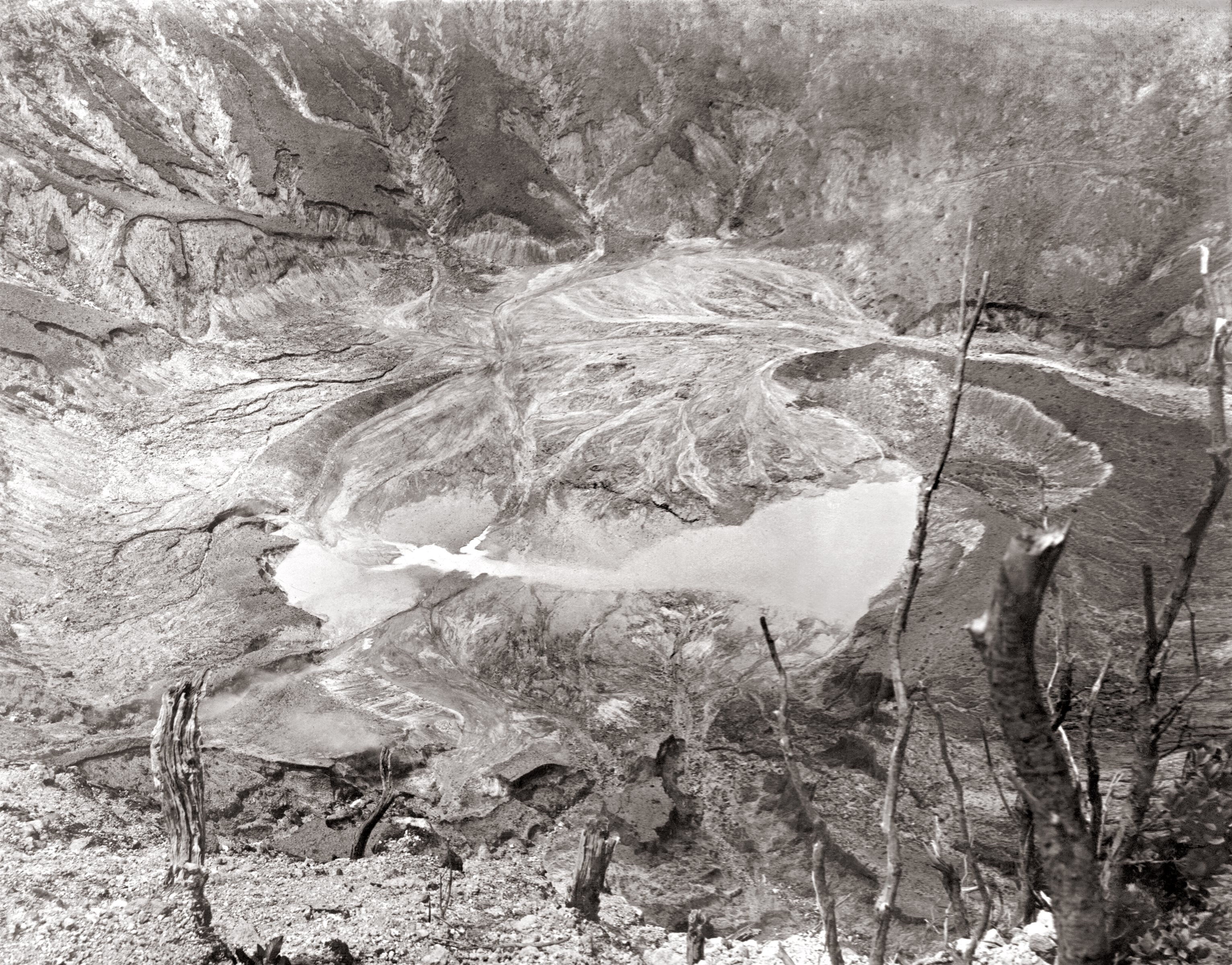
crater c. 1920

Tangkuban Perahu (Tangkuban Parahu) is a stratovolcano in Lembang, West Bandung Regency, West Java, Indonesia. It erupted in 1826, 1829, 1842, 1846, 1896, 1910, 1926, 1929, 1952, 1957, 1961, 1965, 1967, 1969, 1983, 2013 and 2019. It is a popular tourist attraction where tourists hike or ride to the edge of the crater to view the hot water springs and boiling mud up close, and buy eggs cooked on the hot surface. Together with Mount Burangrang and Bukit Tunggul, it is a remnant of the ancient Mount Sunda after the plinian eruption caused the Caldera to collapse.

In April 2005, the Directorate of Volcanology and Geological Hazard Mitigation raised an alert, forbidding visitors from going up the volcano. "Sensors on the slopes of the two mountains - Anak Krakatoa on the southern tip of Sumatra Island and Tangkuban Perahu in Java - picked up an increase in volcanic activity and a build-up of gases, said government volcanologist Syamsul Rizal." On the mountain's northern flank is Death Valley, which derives its name from a frequent accumulation of poisonous gases.

== History of volcanic activity ==
A study conducted in 2001 determined that Tangkuban Perahu had erupted at least 30 times in the previous 40,750 years. Studies of the tephra layers within three kilometres of the crater revealed that 21 were minor eruptions and the remaining were significant eruptions. The eruptions that occurred before approximately 10,000 years ago were magmatic/phreatomagmatic, and the ones that occurred after 10,000 years ago were phreatic. The volcano erupted as recently as 26 July 2019. On 2 August 2019, the volcano experienced eight minor eruptions, and as a result, the place was closed down for visitors, but is open again.

== Legend ==
The name translates roughly to "upturning of (a) boat" or "upturned boat" in Sundanese, referring to the local legend of its creation. The story tells of "Dayang Sumbi", a beauty who lived in West Java. She cast away her son "Sangkuriang" for disobedience, and in her sadness was granted the power of eternal youth by the gods. After many years in exile, Sangkuriang decided to return to his home, long after the two had forgotten and failed to recognise each other. Sangkuriang fell in love with Dayang Sumbi, his mother, and planned to marry her, only for Dayang Sumbi to recognise his birthmark just as he was about to go hunting wild boar. To prevent the marriage from taking place, Dayang Sumbi asked Sangkuriang to build a dam on the river Citarum and to build a large boat to cross the river, both before sunrise. Sangkuriang meditated and summoned mythical ogre-like creatures -buta hejo or green giant(s)- to do his bidding. Dayang Sumbi saw that the tasks were almost completed and called on her workers to spread red silk cloths east of the city, to give the impression of impending sunrise. Sangkuriang was fooled, and upon believing that he had failed, kicked the dam and the unfinished boat, resulting in severe flooding and the creation of Tangkuban Perahu from the hull of the boat.

== See also ==
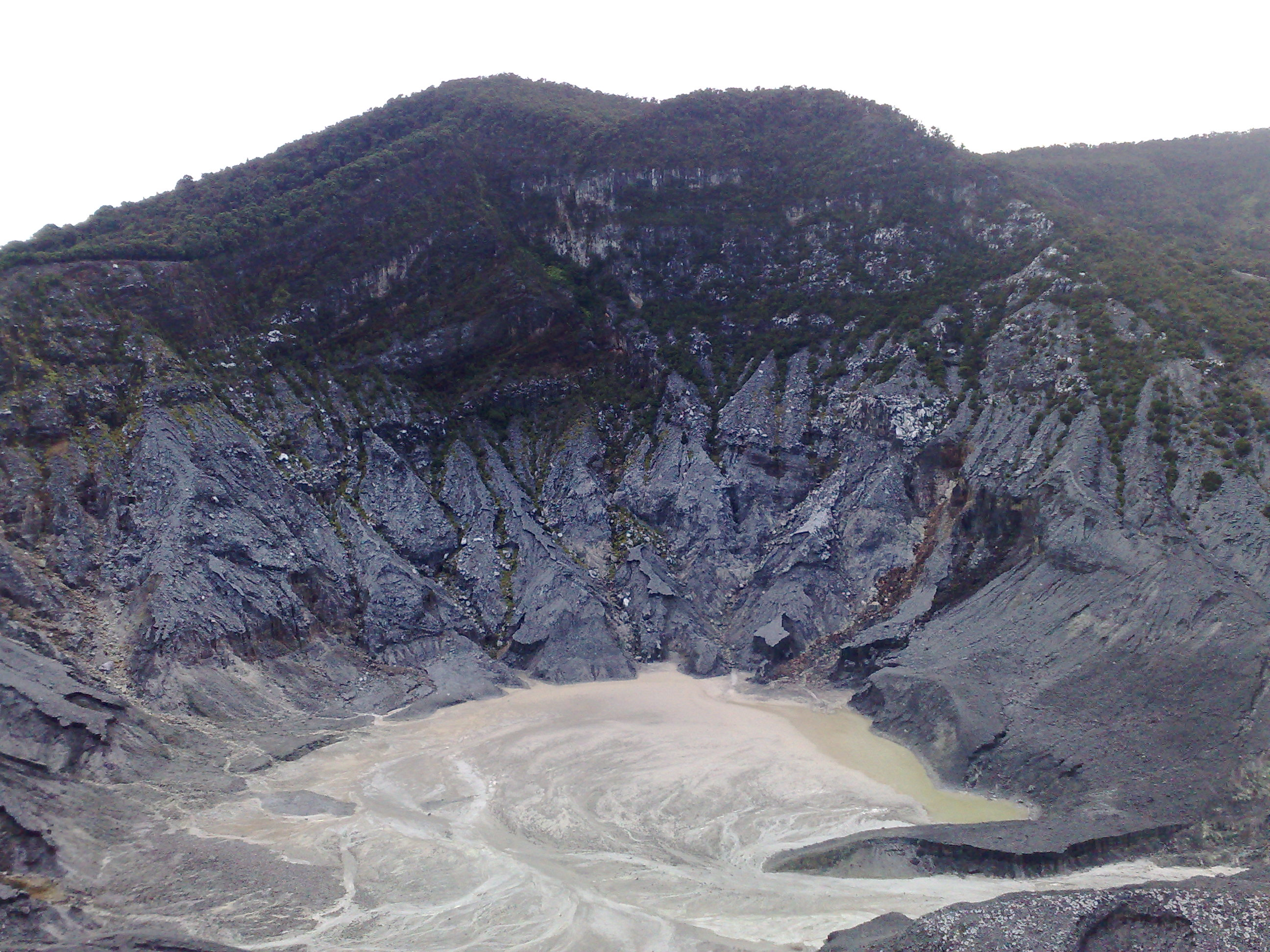
The biggest crater, Kawah Ratu or Queen's Crater of Mount Tangkuban Perahu, Lembang, West Java.

- List of volcanoes in Indonesia
- Sangkuriang
