= Flag of Bandung =

Bandung
- Proportion: 7:5
- Adopted: 8 June 1953
- Design: A horizontal triband of green, yellow, and blue
- Designed by: Bandung City Regional Regulation

The flag of Bandung is the official flag of the city of Bandung. It was adopted on 8 June 1953 and has a proportion of 7:5. The flag consists of three horizontal stripes of green, yellow, and blue.

Green represents coolness and prosperity, yellow represents welfare of the people, and blue represents loyalty. The flag is similar to the flag of Gabon. The flag is often found wrapped around trees instead of flying on a flagpole. Although in recent years, the use of the flag has become more widespread among the city government and certain localities.

== See also ==
- Coat of arms of Bandung
