= Patenggang Lake =

Lake in Indonesia

- Situ Patenggang (Indonesian)
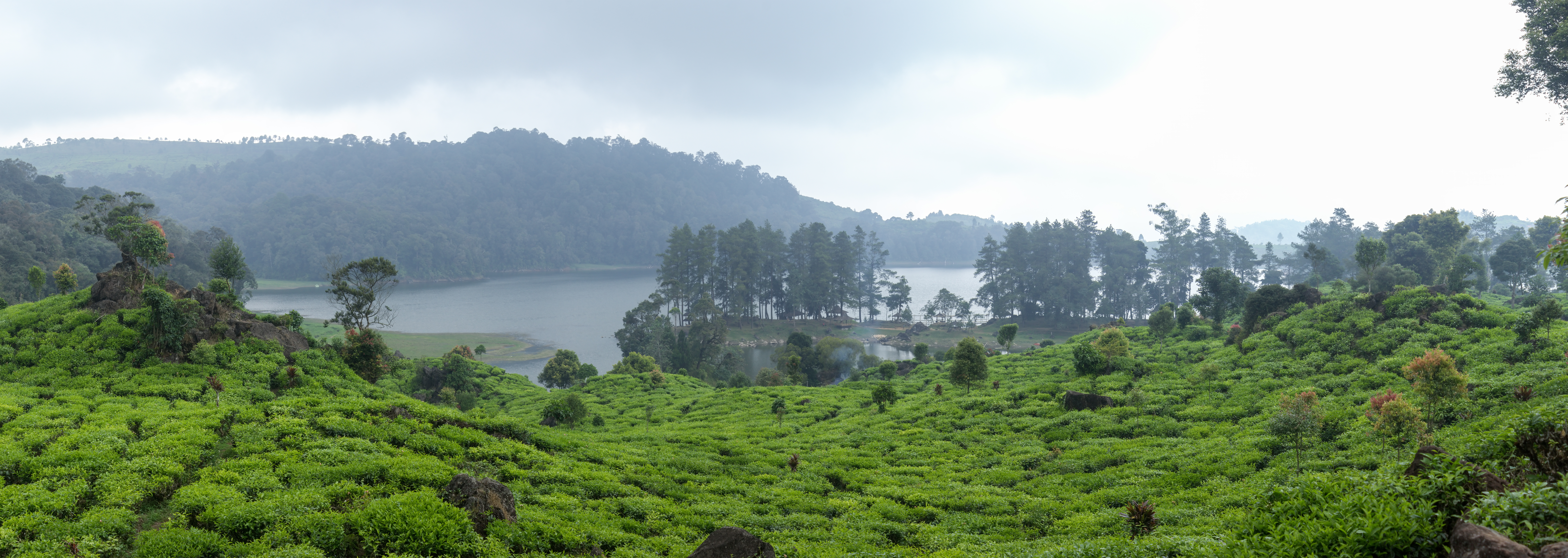
- A view of Patenggang Lake from approaching road

- Location within Java
- Location: West Java, Indonesia
- Coordinates: 7.16460°S 107.35805°E
- Basin countries: Indonesia
- Surface area: 450 km^{2} (170 sq mi)
- Surface elevation: 1,600 m (5,200 ft)
- Settlements: Bandung
- Website: indonesia-tourism.com/west-java/patengan-lake.html

Patenggang Lake (Indonesian: Situ Patenggang) is a lake located in the area of natural tourist attractions in the southern Bandung City, West Java, Indonesia, to be exact it is in Ciwidey village. Located at an altitude of 1600 meters above sea level, this lake has a very exotic landscape. The lake is spread over an area of about 45,000 hectares and the surrounding nature reserve has an area of about 123,077.15 hectares.

The lake is called Situ Patengan by the local society, as the pronunciation of patengan is too difficult to say in Sundanese patenggang. The lake and adjoining area is a popular tourist destination.

The label/name of the lake in Google Maps is Situ Penganten which Penganten means newlywed couple.

== Satellite Image ==
Click here to view in Google Maps
