= Bina Bangsa School =

Group of schools in Indonesia

- 培民学校
- Jakarta, Bandung, Semarang, Malang, Balikpapan, Nusantara; Indonesia

Information
- Type: International Christian school
- Motto: Gloria Dei Vivens Homo (Men Live to Glorify God)
- Religious affiliation: Christian
- Established: 2001
- Faculty: 500- 1000
- Enrollment: 4000
- Average class size: 24 students
- Language: English, Indonesian, Chinese
- Campus: Urban
- Website: binabangsaschool.com

Bina Bangsa School (Mandarin: 培民学校 Pinyin : Péi Mín Xué Xiào), often abbreviated as BBS, is a group of schools located in Jakarta, Bandung, Semarang, Malang, Balikpapan, and Nusantara, Indonesia.

Bina Bangsa School is an international Christian school open to both Indonesian and foreign students. The school's primary language of instruction is English, along with Mandarin Chinese as a Second Language. The phrase "Bina Bangsa" itself means "to build the nation" in Indonesian.

== Cambridge international programme and curriculum ==
They have nearly 500-1000 employees in this very school. Bina Bangsa School is an authorized Cambridge International Examinations Center. Students attempt the Cambridge IGCSE examinations during Secondary 4 (Grade 10) before attempting the Cambridge GCE A-Level examinations in Junior College 2 (Grade 12). The A-Level examinations follow Option 3 of the assessment options, but students have the option of doing retakes during the following year's May/June session and work on them together with the A2 Level examinations if they wish to. The school follows a Singaporean-style curriculum.

The education program in BBS includes Grade 1 to Grade 12. The grades are divided into three groups: primary school level (abbreviated Primary or P; e.g. P5 for Grade 5) which consists of P1 up to P6, secondary school level (abbreviated Secondary or Sec; e.g. Sec 4 for Grade 10) that consists of Sec 1 up to Sec 4 and Junior College level (abbreviated JC; e.g. JC2 for Grade 12) which consists of JC1 and JC2 only. Both the Secondary school and Junior College levels are often combined into the Secondary level and are internally referred to as SJC.

== Other campuses ==
Bina Bangsa School was first established in 2001 with its first building in Kebon Jeruk, Jakarta. After a few years, other campuses were built around the country. BBS Primary Kebon Jeruk (BBS KJ), BBS Malang, BBS Pantai Indah Kapuk (BBS-PIK) (PIK, Jakarta), BBS Bandung, BBS Semarang, and BBS Balikpapan are all under the same umbrella. As of 5 June 2024, groundbreaking and construction has begun for a new BBS campus in Nusantara.

=== Kebon Jeruk ===
Bina Bangsa School Kebon Jeruk Secondary

Location
- Jalan Arjuna Selatan, RW 12, Kebon Jeruk, West Jakarta, Jakarta Special Capital Region, 11530, Indonesia

Information
- Principal: Mr Richard H

Bina Bangsa School Kebon Jeruk Pre-School and Primary

Location
- Jalan Budi Swadaya, RW 12, Kebon Jeruk, West Jakarta, Jakarta Special Capital Region, 11530, Indonesia

Information
- Principal: Ms Vaasuhi

Bina Bangsa School Kebon Jeruk Secondary was the first campus of Bina Bangsa School. The building is 7 stories high, with a car park in its basement and is equipped with

- Physics, Chemistry, and Biology laboratory
- 2 computer laboratories
- Library
- One assembly hall and two multi-purpose halls.

Its primary school is located nearby. The primary school is 4 stories high and surrounds a basketball court. The facility has two semi-outdoor swimming pools.

=== Pantai Indah Kapuk ===
Bina Bangsa School Pantai Indah Kapuk

Location
- Bina Bangsa School, Jalan Walet Elok 8, RT 16, RW 06, Penjaringan, Kapuk Muara, Penjaringan, North Jakarta, Jakarta Special Capital Region, 14470, Indonesia

Bina Bangsa School Pantai Indah Kapuk has a combined Pre-School, Primary, and Secondary school. The school is located adjacent to Singapore International School.

Facilities include

- Over 300 classrooms.
- 2 main auditoriums, and 2 smaller auditoriums. All 4 halls are multi-purpose and are used for general assemblies, examinations, sports, and performances.
- Chapel. A small lecture hall used for chapel services, lectures along staged performances.
- Sports Facilities. The school compound has multiple sports facilities. This includes 2 outdoor football fields, 2 outdoor basketball fields, and a swimming pool. Auditoriums are generally used for indoor sporting activities such as badminton and basketball.
- 5 Science laboratories, each capable of supporting 30 students, containing the required apparatus and materials needed for the IGCSE and A-Level curriculum-based examinations.
- 4 computer laboratories
- Car Park
- Cafeteria
- Bookstores
- Libraries
- Playgrounds

=== Bandung ===
Bina Bangsa School Bandung

Location
- Jl. Sentra Dago Pakar Raya Resor Dago Pakar Raya No.1, Mekarsaluyu, Kec. Cimenyan, Kabupaten Bandung, Jawa Barat, 40191, Indonesia

Bina Bangsa School Bandung has a combined Pre-School, Primary, and Secondary school.

== Student body ==
There are about 1000 students in the main BBS Kebon Jeruk campus and a total of about 7500 in the other branches. Most of these students are Indonesian but are mainly of Chinese descent. The language of use is English but there are also lessons in Mandarin and Indonesian.
