= Djuanda Forest Park =

Botanical garden in Bandung, Indonesia

Coordinates: 6.857108°S 107.633001°E

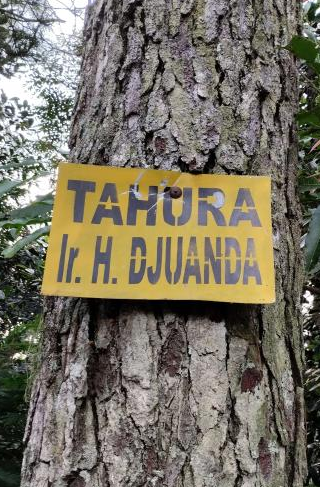
Sign located on the park border

Taman Hutan Raya Ir. H. Juanda (lt. Grand Forest Park of (engineer) H. Juanda), locally shortened to "Tahura" is a conservation area and botanical garden in Bandung, Indonesia.

The park is named after Djuanda Kartawidjaja, the last Prime Minister of Indonesia. It is located in Kampung Pakar, Ciburial Village, in the Cimenyan District. Its altitude ranges between 770 and 1330 meters above sea level. Its fertile soil sustains about 2500 types of plants, consisting of 40 familia and 112 species. Notable specimens include the Pinus merkusii, a pine tree known to exceed 30 metres in height and only grows at high altitudes. In 1965 the park was established with an extent of around 10 ha, but this has expanded to 590 hectares stretching from Dago Pakar to Maribaya. It is currently managed by the Forestry Service of West Java Provincial Government (previously under the auspices of Perum Perhutani).

== Places of Interest at Djuanda Forest Park ==
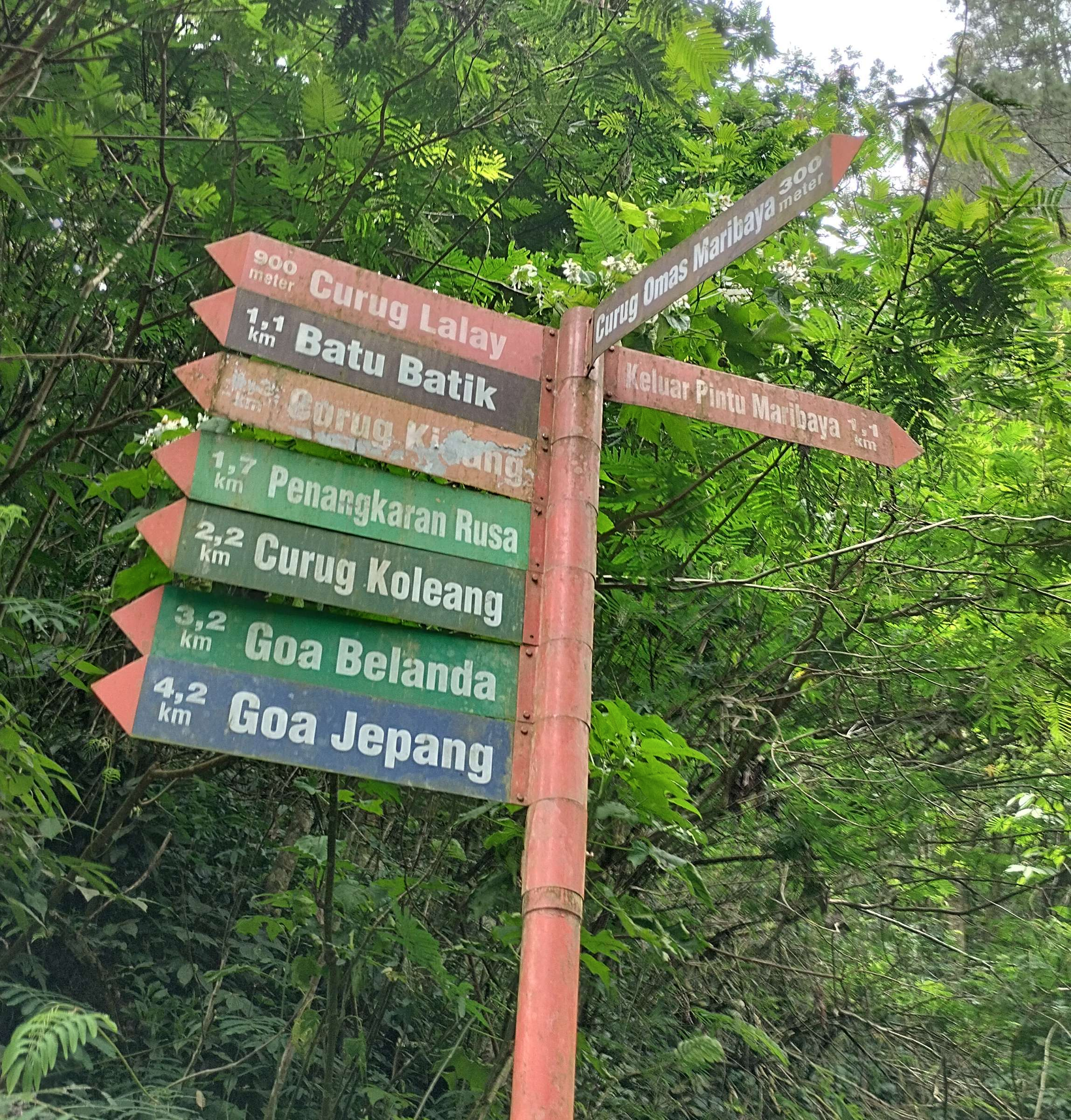
Signpost pointing to several attractions

The park is home to several waterfalls, rock formations, man-made caves, as well as several bridges, all connected with forest paths. These paths are frequented by locals and tourists alike, with some sections paved with bricks and the rest with cobblestone. On weekends or holidays, the park often becomes a busy hiking spot.

=== Dutch Cave ===
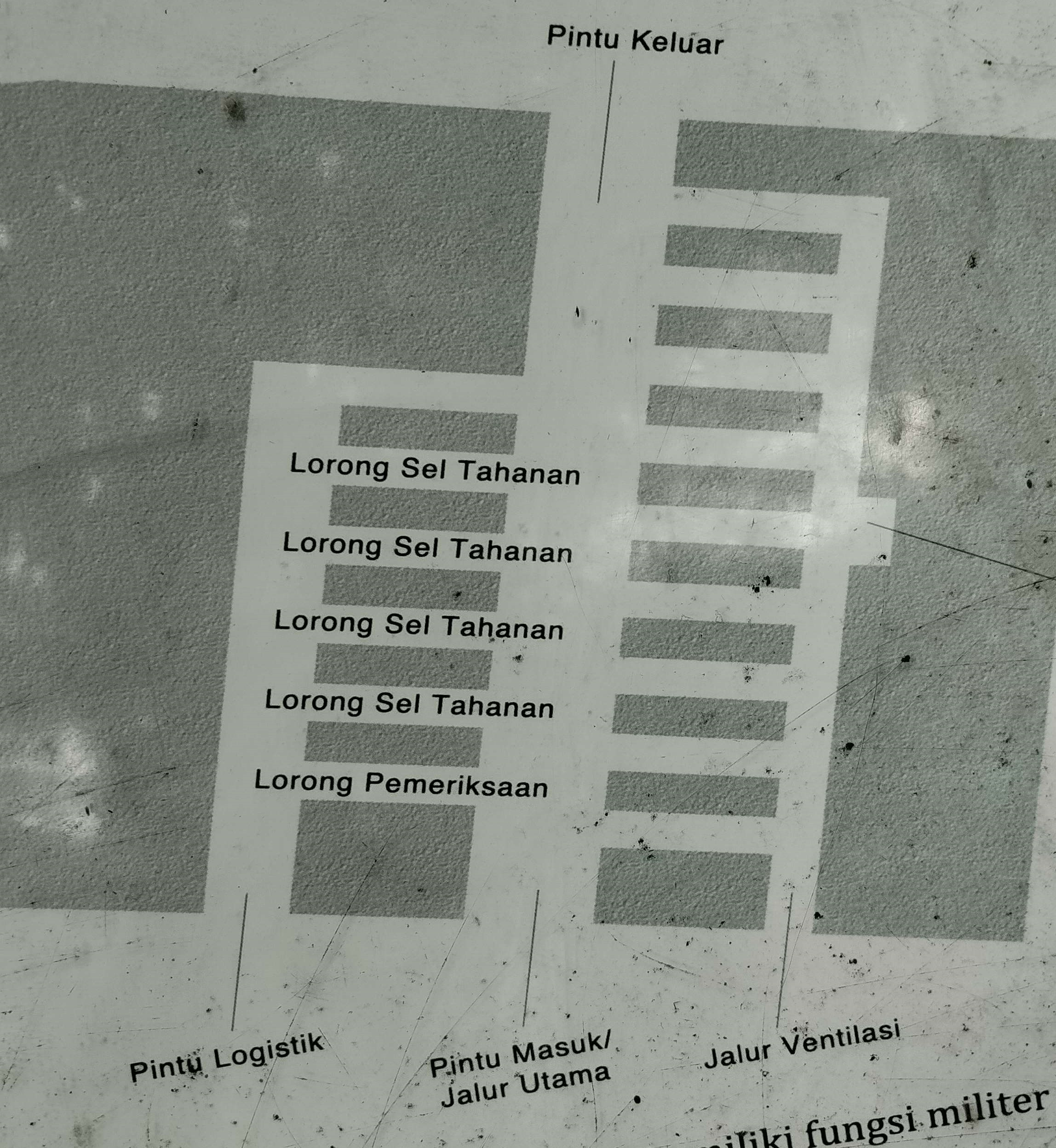
Layout of the Dutch cave

Colloquially known as Gua Belanda or Goa Belanda, which translates to "Dutch Cave", this cave was originally a tunnel, cutting straight through a hill and measuring 144 metres in length. It is situated roughly 300 metres from the secondary park entrance, and can be reached within a 5 minute walk. This cave is a remnant of Dutch colonial occupation in the region, being a man-made structure constructed by the Dutch in 1901. Its original purpose was to aid in servicing the nearby hydroelectric power plant. It was refurbished in 1918 and added the halls and corridors, though to this day 2 corridors are only partly done, and can only be accessed via small openings from the main shaft.

Because of its strategic and hidden location, this cave was repurposed for military use during World War 2, housing a military radio station for its safety from air raids. In early 1941, the cave was refurbished to serve as a military stronghold and a base of operations. The cave consists of 15 hallways in a grid-like arrangement, with 3 metal doors measuring 3.2 metres tall each. A pair is located on each end of the main tunnel, with a third door used for logistics placed to the side. The cave and its surroundings occupy an area of 0.6 hectares, and the total floorspace inside the cave itself measures to 547 square metres. A security post is located near the entrance

=== Keraton Cliff ===
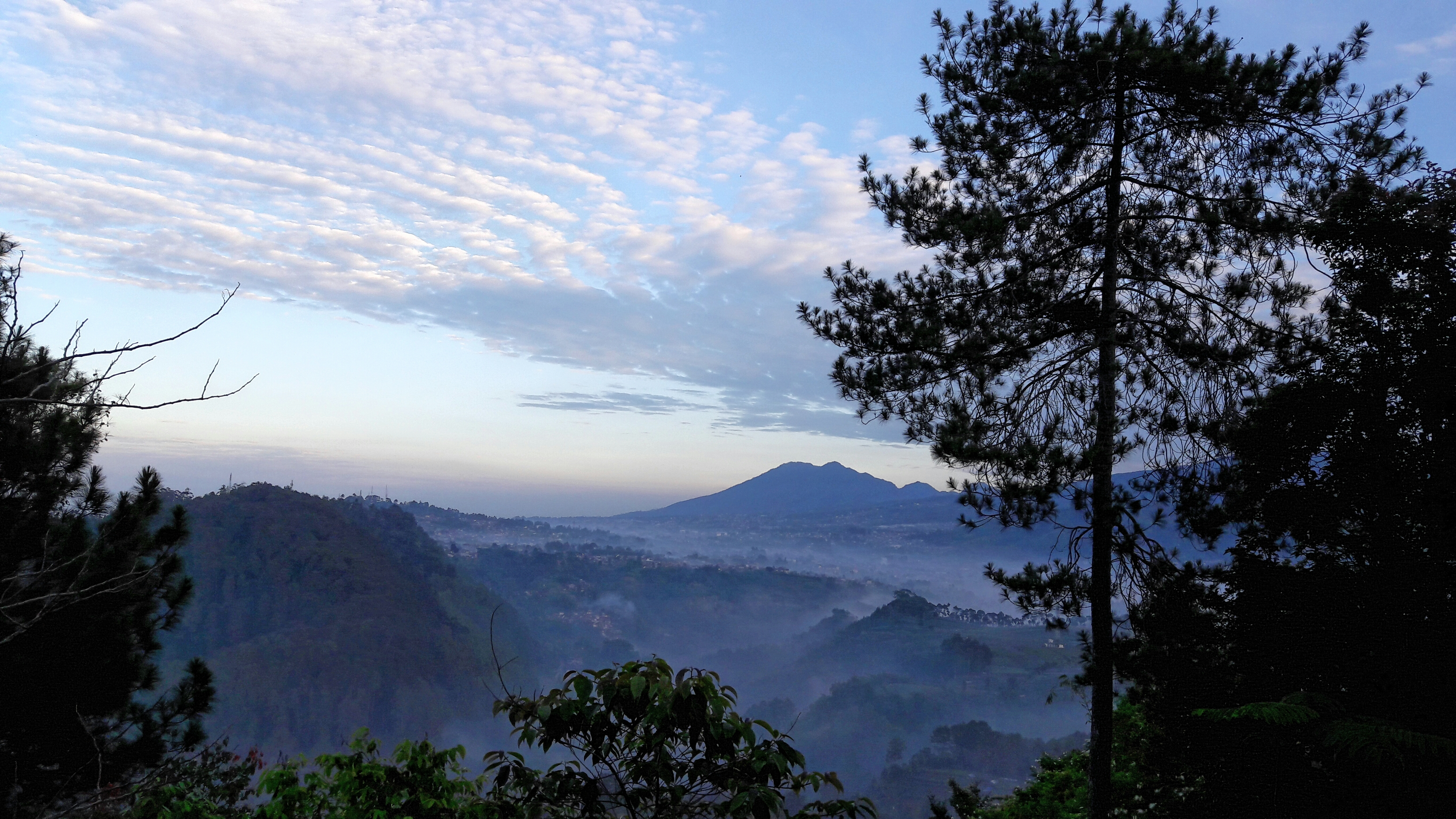
View from Keraton Cliff

Keraton Cliff is an observation area located on a cliff-face facing the Lembang Fault and the Lembang Plateau. It is situated 1200 metres above sea level, and oversees the Maribaya Valley, with the nearby Curug Omas visible on the southern side. The complex contains a 2-lane observation deck leading to the cliff-face, an observation tower, and camping grounds. The local name is Tebing Keraton, meaning "Keraton cliff"; an older name is Karang Jontor, which in Sundanese roughly translates to "jutting forwards", owing to the rock formation. Entrance fees to the Keraton Cliff is separate from Tahura, with local tourists paying Rp.11,000 and foreign tourists paying Rp.76,000. Camping fees are Rp. 40,000 provided you bring your own tents, and parking fees are Rp.10,000 for cars and Rp. 5,000 for motorbikes.

=== Curug Omas ===
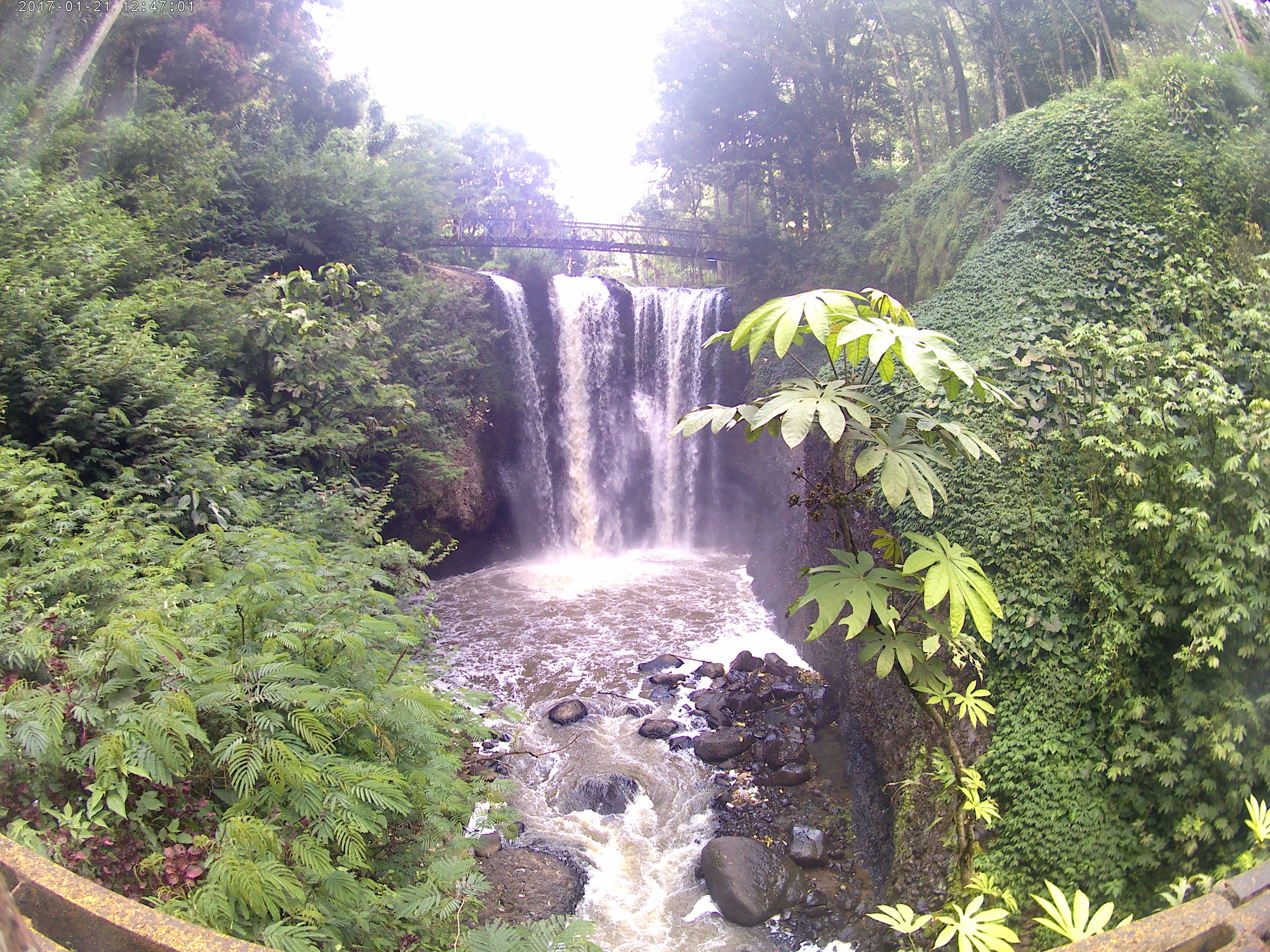
Curug Omas

Curug Omas or Omas Waterfall is located at the start of Upstream Cikapundung, where the Cikawari and Ciwagun rivers meet. The waterfall itself is 30 metres high, with water reaching depths of 10 metres at the base.
