= Sri Baduga Museum =

State museum in Bandung, Indonesia

- Museum Sri Baduga
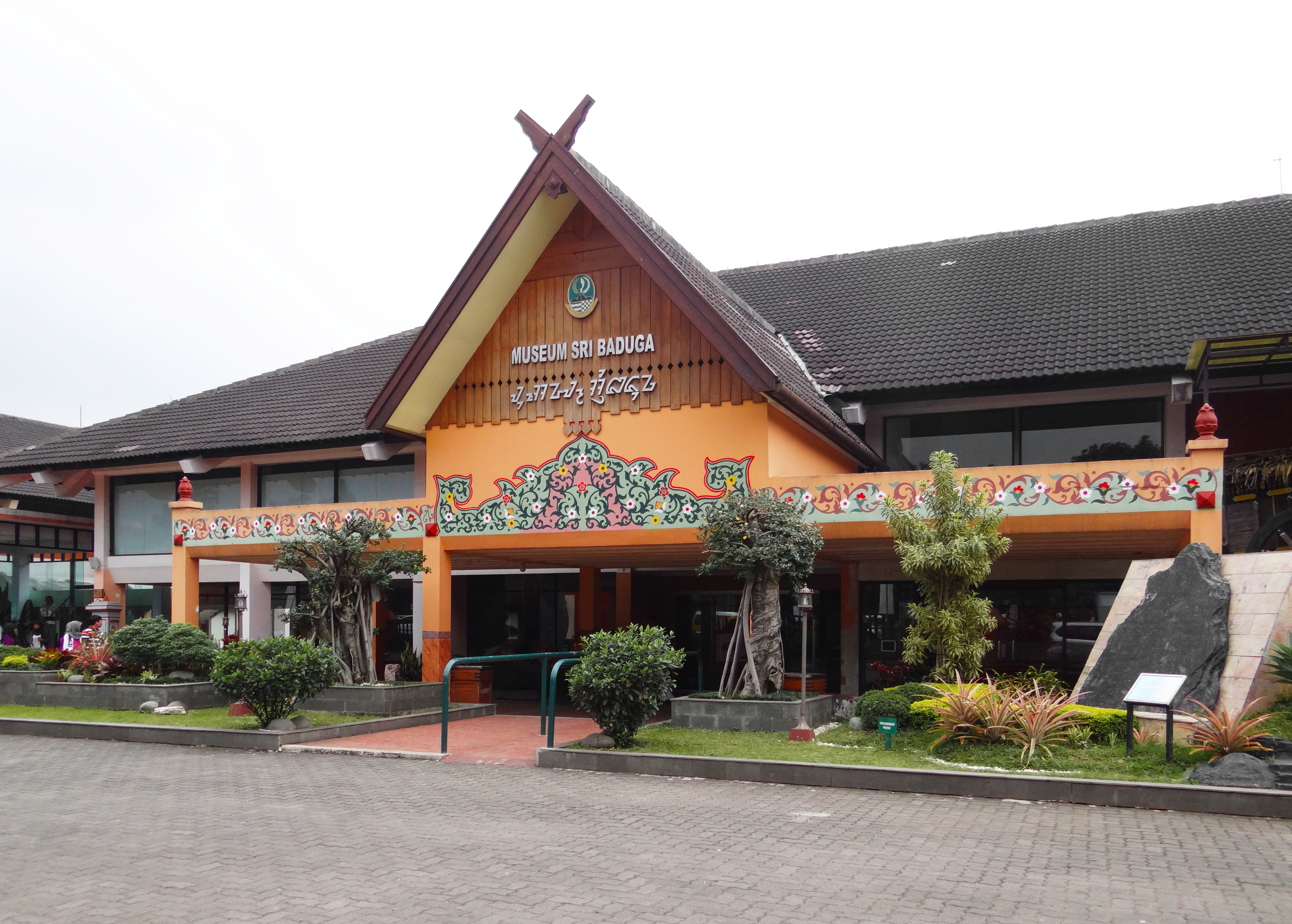
- Sri Baduga Museum
- Established: 5 June 1980
- Location: Jalan B.K.R. 185 Tegallega, Bandung
- Coordinates: 6.937808°S 107.603578°E
- Type: culture
- Owner: Government of West Java Province
- Public transit access: Trans Metro Bandung: Corridor 4 (Tegallega)
- Parking: available
- Website: Museum Sri Baduga Website

Sri Baduga Museum (Indonesian Museum Sri Baduga) is a state museum located in Bandung, Indonesia. As a state museum, the museum features various items related with the province of West Java, such as Sundanese crafts, furnishings, geologic history, and natural diversity.

== History ==
Sri Baduga Museum was first founded in 1974 within a building formerly used as the government office of the Kawedanan Tegallega, a former administrative division within Bandung. On 5 June 1980, the museum was officially founded as Museum Negeri Propinsi Jawa Barat ("State Museum of West Java Province") by the Ministry of Education and Cultural at that time, Dr. Daud Yusuf. In 1990, the museum was renamed Museum Negeri Propinsi Jawa Barat Sri Baduga ("Sri Baduga State Museum of West Java Province") or Sri Baduga Museum, after a 15th-century Sundanese King Sri Baduga Maharaja.

== Collection ==
Sri Baduga Museum collects items related with the Province of West Java. The collection is spread over three floors. The first floor displays the initial development of the natural history and culture of West Java. The history of West Java is described by a display of heritage items from the prehistoric era to the Hindu-Buddhist era.

The second floor includes an exhibition of traditional cultural objects which were important for living, trade and transport, as well as the influence of the Islam and European culture, the history of national struggle, and various seals of cities in West Java.

The third floor contains ethnographic collections in the form of fabrics, art and ceramics.

== See also ==
- List of museums and cultural institutions in Indonesia
