= Bandung =

Capital city of West Java, Indonesia

- City
- City of Bandung; Kota Bandung

Regional transcription(s)
  - Sundanese: ᮓᮚᮩᮂ ᮘᮔ᮪ᮓᮥᮀ
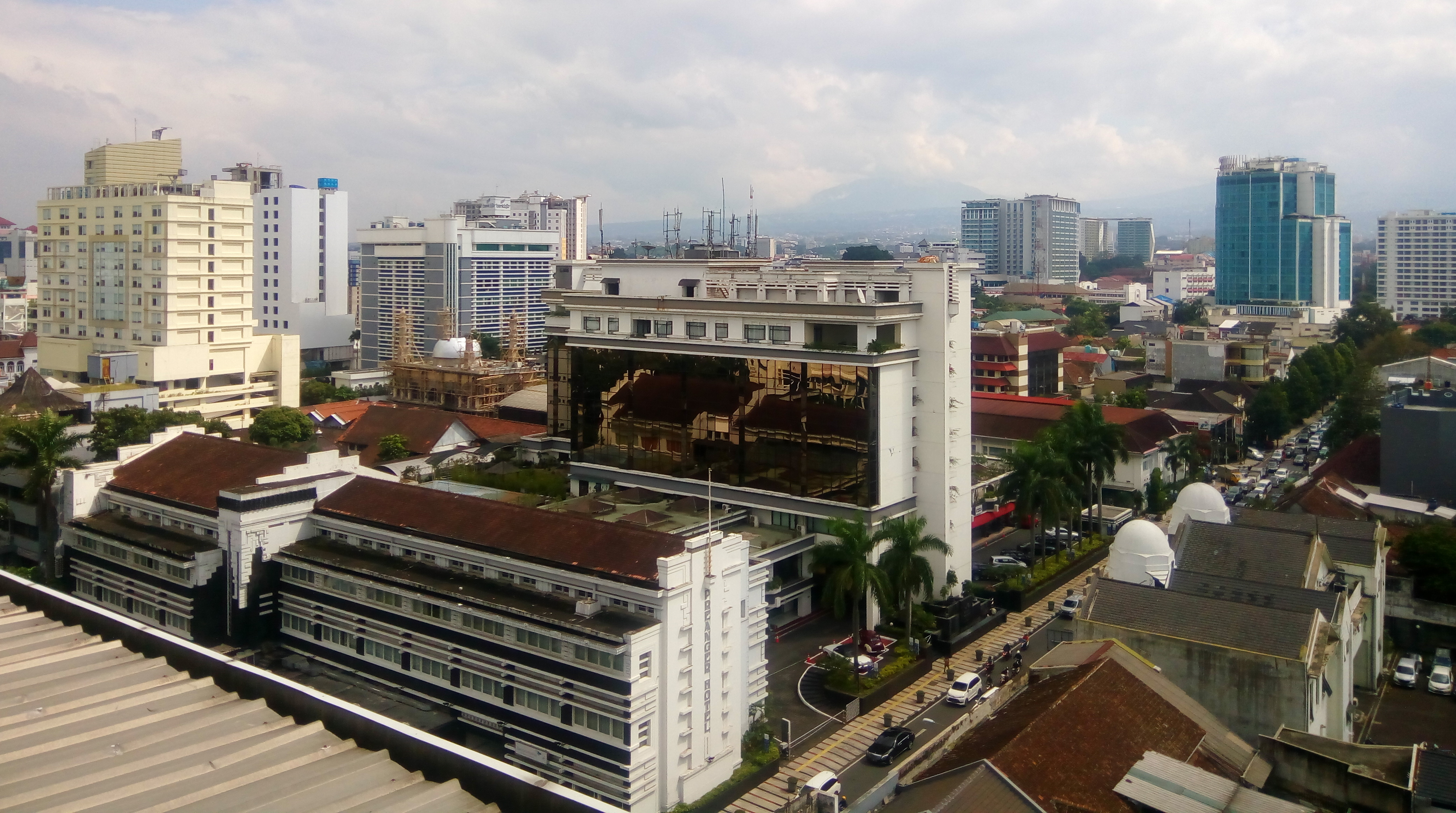
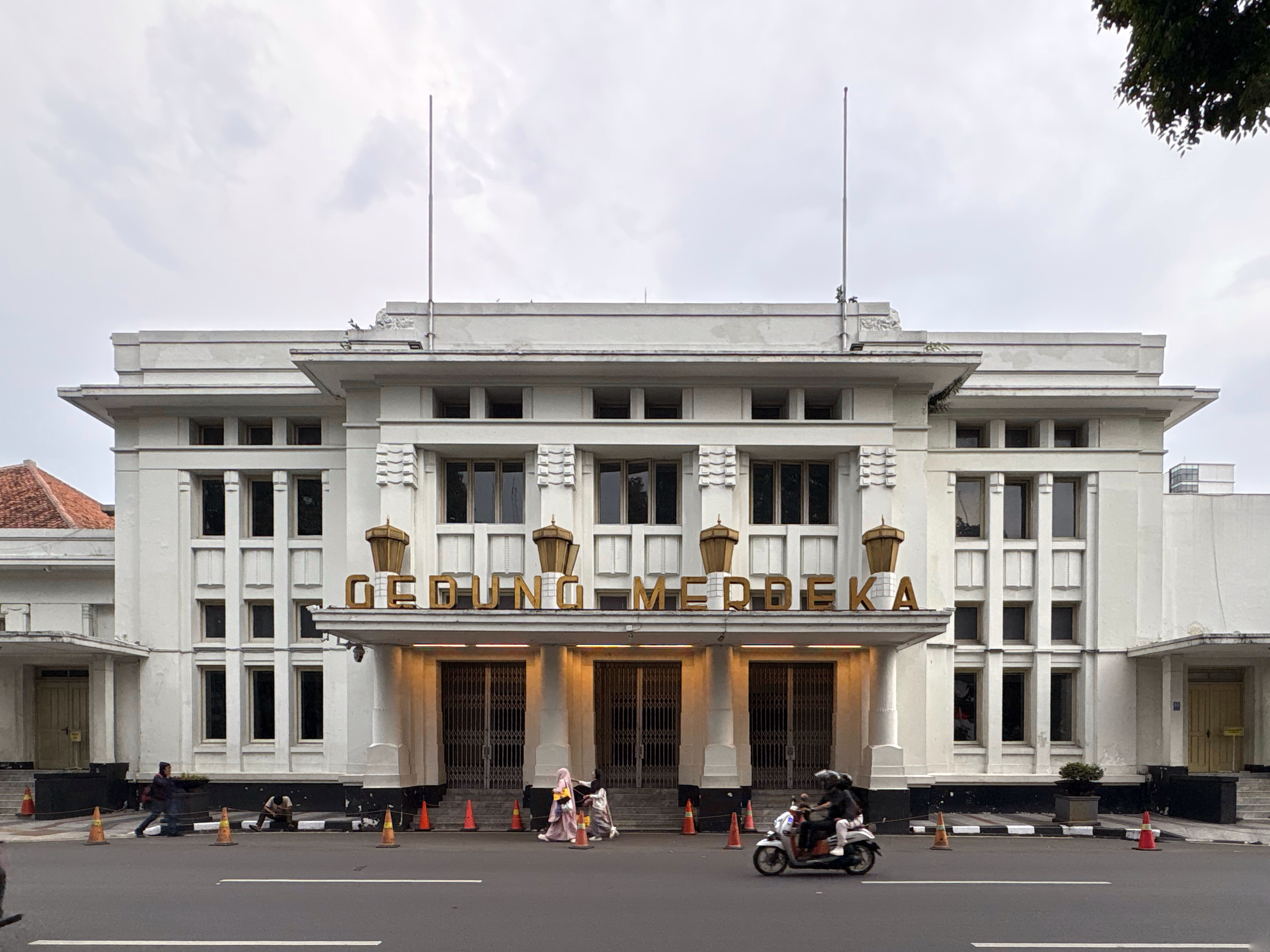
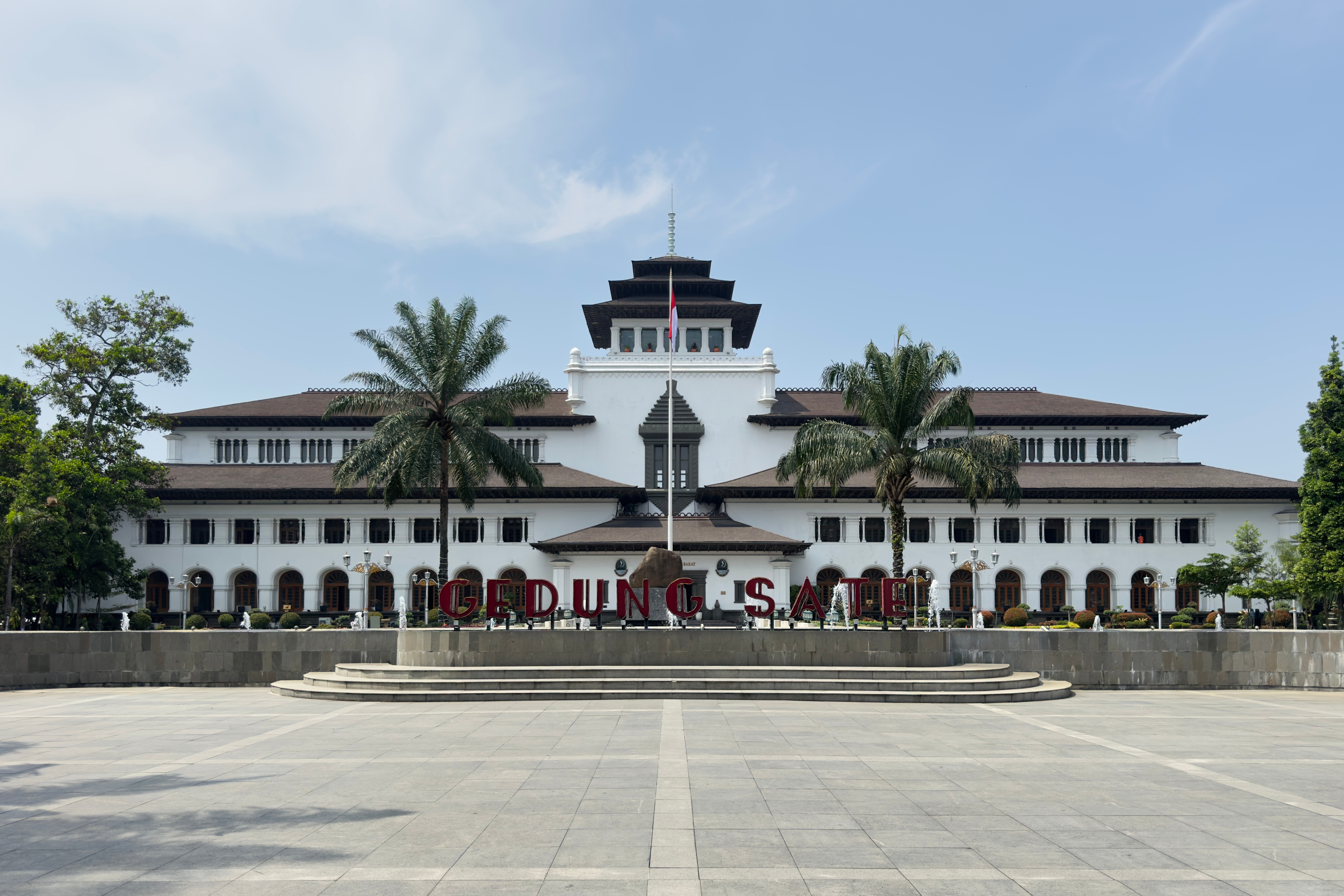
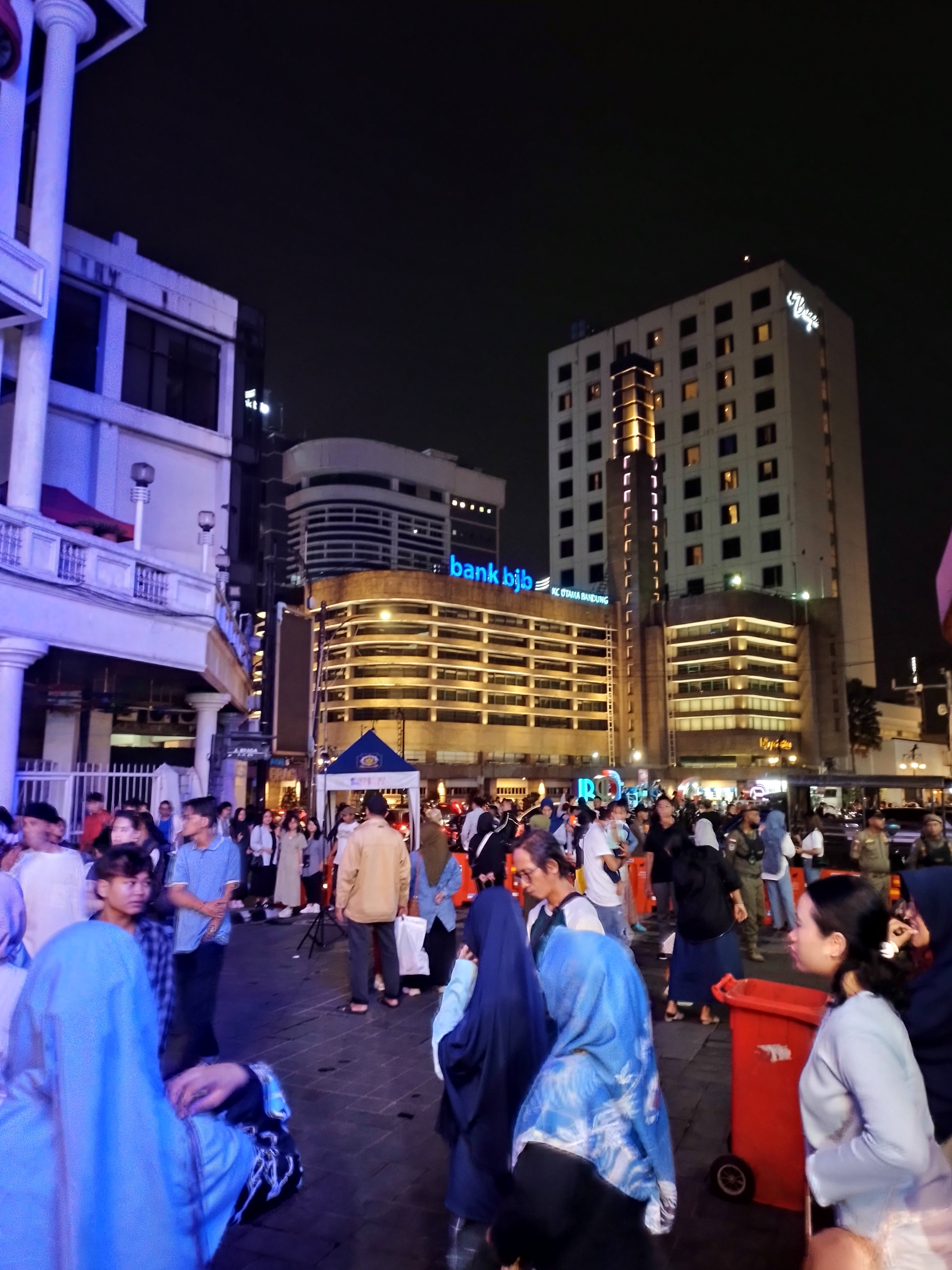
- Bandung skyline Merdeka Building Al Jabbar Grand Mosque Gedung Sate Braga Street

- Flag Coat of arms
- Nicknames: Parijs van Java (Dutch) "Paris of Java"; Kota Kembang (Indonesian) "Flower City"
- Motto: Gemah, Ripah, Wibawa Mukti (Sundanese) ᮌᮨᮙᮂ ᮛᮤᮕᮂ ᮝᮤᮘᮝ ᮙᮥᮊ᮪ᮒᮤ "Prosperous, Peaceful, Prestigious Joyous"
- Location within West Java
- Interactive map of Bandung
- Location in Java and Indonesia Bandung (Indonesia)
- Coordinates: 6°55′19″S 107°36′25″E
- Country: Indonesia
- Province: West Java
- Metropolitan area: Bandung Basin
- Founded: 25 September 1810
- Incorporated (as gemeente): 1 April 1906
- Administrative division: 30 districts 153 urban villages

Government
  - Type: Mayor-council
  - Body: Bandung City Government
  - Mayor: Muhammad Farhan (NasDem)
  - Vice Mayor: Erwin
  - Legislature: Bandung City Regional House of Representatives (DPRD)

Area
  - Total: 167.31 km^{2} (64.60 sq mi)
  - Metro: 1,876.8 km^{2} (724.6 sq mi)
- Elevation: 708 m (2,323 ft)
- Highest elevation: 892 m (2,927 ft)
- Lowest elevation: 666 m (2,185 ft)

Population (mid 2023 estimate)
  - Total: 2,528,163
  - Rank: 4th
  - Density: 14,982/km^{2} (38,800/sq mi)
  - Metro: 9,054,175
  - Metro density: 4,453/km^{2} (11,530/sq mi)
- Demonyms: Bandungite

Nominal GDP (nominal, 2023)
  - Total: Rp 351.285 trillion US$ 23.046 billion
  - Per capita: Rp 140.114 million US$ 9,194
- Time zone: UTC+07:00 (Western Indonesia Time/W.I.B)
- Postcodes: 401xx, 402xx, 406xx
- Area code: (+62) 22
- Vehicle registration: D
- HDI (2024): ▲0.835 (16th) very high
- Website: bandung.go.id

Bandung (Note: Sundanese: ᮓᮚᮩᮂ ᮘᮔ᮪ᮓᮥᮀ, romanized: Dayeuh Bandung, pronounced [ˈbandʊŋ]; /ˈbɑːndʊŋ/, Van Ophuijsen Spelling: Bandoeng) is the capital city of the West Java province of Indonesia. Located on the western highland of Java island, it has one of the coolest climates compared to other provincial capitals in Indonesia, situated 708 meters (2,323 feet) above sea level (the highest point being at an altitude of 892 meters (2,927 feet) in the north, and the lowest at 666 meters (2,185 feet) in the south), approximately 145 kilometres (90 miles) southeast of Jakarta. Bandung lies in a river basin surrounded by volcanic mountains that provide a natural defense system, which was the primary reason for the Dutch East Indies government's plan to move the capital from Batavia (modern-day Jakarta) to Bandung.

The Dutch first established tea plantations around the mountains in the 18th century. In the early 19th century, a road was constructed to connect the plantation area with Batavia the colonial capital located 180 kilometers (112 miles) to the northwest and to serve as a transport route for the island of Java's defense network. In the early 20th century, the Dutch population in Bandung demanded the establishment of a municipal government (gemeente) a request granted in 1906 and the city subsequently developed into an exclusive resort area for Europeans, complete with hotels, cafés, and shops. Braga Street evolved into an elite district lined with cafés, restaurants, and boutiques; the abundance of shops selling fashion items from Paris earned the city the nickname Parijs van Java (Dutch: "The Paris of Java").

After Indonesia declared independence in 1945, the city experienced ongoing development and urbanization, transforming from an idyllic town into a dense 16,500 people/km^{2} (per square kilometer) metropolitan area with living space for over 8 million people. New skyscrapers, high-rise buildings, bridges, and gardens have been constructed. Natural resources have been heavily exploited, particularly by conversion of the protected upland area into highland villas and real estate. Although the city has encountered many problems (ranging from waste disposal and floods to a complicated traffic system resulting from a lack of road infrastructure), it still attracts large numbers of tourists, weekend sightseers, and migrants from other parts of Indonesia. In 2017, the city won a regional environmental sustainability award for having the cleanest air among major cities in ASEAN. The city is also known as a Smart City, leveraging technology to improve government services and social media that alert residents to issues such as floods or traffic jams. The city is part of the UNESCO Creative Cities Network, which it joined in 2015. Bandung is Indonesia's major technology centre.

The first Asian-African Conference, the Bandung Conference, was hosted in Bandung by President Sukarno in 1955 and is now a decennial event. Redevelopment of the existing Husein Sastranegara International Airport (BDO) was completed in 2016. The new larger second airport for Greater Bandung Kertajati International Airport (KJT), facilitates the flow of tourists to the city.

== History ==
Coat of Arms of Bandung during the Dutch colonial era, granted in 1928

The official name of the city during the colonial Dutch East Indies period was Bandoeng. The earliest reference to the area dates back to 1488, although archaeological findings suggest a type of Homo erectus species had long previously lived on the banks of the Cikapundung River and around the old lake of Bandung. During the 17th and 18th centuries, the Dutch East Indies Company (VOC) established plantations in the Bandung area. In 1786, a supply road connecting Batavia (now Jakarta), Bogor, Cianjur, Bandung, Sumedang and Cirebon was constructed. In 1809, Napoleon ordered Governor Herman Willem Daendels to improve the defensive systems of Java to protect against a possible British invasion. Daendels ordered the construction of a road stretching approximately 1,000 km (620 mi) from the west to the east coast of Java, passing through Bandung. In 1810, the road was laid down in Bandung and was named De Groote Postweg (or the 'Great Post Road'), the present-day location of Jalan Asia-Afrika. Under Daendels' orders, R. A. Wiranatakusumah II, the Chief Administrator of the Bandung regency at that time, moved the office from Krapyak, in the south, to a place near a pair of holy city wells (sumur Bandung), the present-day site of the city square (alun-alun). He built his dalem (palace), masjid agung (the grand mosque) and pendopo (public-official meeting place) in the classical Sundanese orientation, with the pendopo facing Tangkuban Perahu mountain, which was believed to have a mystical ambience. In 1856, Bandung also became the capital of the Preanger Regencies Residency, which it would remain until 1925.

The first major railroad between Batavia and Bandung was completed in 1880, boosting the light industry in Bandung. Chinese flocked into the city to help run facilities, services and vendors. The area adjacent to the train station is still recognizable as the old Chinatown district. In 1906, Bandung was given the status of gemeente (municipality), and then twenty years later, stadsgemeente (city municipality).

From the early 1920s, the Dutch East Indies government made plans to move their capital from Batavia to Bandung. Accordingly, during this decade, the Dutch colonial government commenced construction of military barracks, the building housing the colonial Department of State-Owned Enterprises (Department van Gouvernmentsbedrijven, the present-day Gedung Sate) and other government buildings. However, this plan was cut short by World War II, after which the Dutch were not able to re-establish their colony due to the Indonesian National Revolution.

The fertile area of the Parahyangan Mountains surrounding Bandung supports productive tea plantations. In the nineteenth century, Franz Junghuhn introduced the cinchona (kina) plant. With its cooler elevated landscape, surrounded by major plantations, Bandung became an exclusive European resort area. Wealthy plantation owners visited the city on weekends, attracting ladies and business people from the capital, Batavia. Jalan Braga grew into a promenade street with cafés, restaurants and boutique shops. Two art-deco style hotels, Savoy Homann and Preanger, were built in the vicinity of the Concordia Society, a clubhouse for the wealthy with a large ballroom and a theatre.

After Indonesian independence in 1945, Bandung was designated as the capital of West Java province. During the Indonesian National Revolution, some of the most massive battles occurred in and around Bandung. Dutch troops were virtually absent in Java at the end of World War II. To assist the restoration of Dutch sovereignty, British forces established a military presence in several of Java's largest cities, and issued an ultimatum to Indonesian forces in Bandung in an attempt to make them leave the city. In response, on 24 March 1946, much of the southern part of Bandung was deliberately set alight by Indonesian forces as they withdrew.

In 1955, the first Asian-African Conference, also known as the Bandung Conference, was hosted in Bandung by President Sukarno and attended by the heads of states representing twenty-nine independent countries from Asia and Africa. The conference venue was at the Gedung Merdeka, the former Concordia Society building. The conference announced ten points of declaration for the promotion of world peace and opposition against colonialism and is known as the Declaration of Bandung. This was followed by a wave of nationalism and decolonization movements around the globe which remapped world politics. The conference was also the first international conference of people of colour in history. In his book The Color Curtain, Richard Wright claims that there was an epic meaning to the conference for people of colour around the world.

In 1987, the city boundary was expanded by the 'Greater Bandung' (Bandung Raya) plan, with the relocation of higher concentration development zones outside the city in an attempt to dilute population density in the old city. During this development, the city core was often uprooted, with old buildings torn down, lot sizes regrouped and rezoned, changing idyllic residential areas to commercial zones with bustling chain supermarkets, malls, banks and upscale developments.

In 2005, an Asian-African Conference was partly held in Bandung, attended by world leaders including Indonesian President Susilo B. Yudhoyono, President of China Hu Jintao, Prime Minister of India Manmohan Singh, President of South Africa Thabo Mbeki and President of Nigeria Obasanjo.

== Geography ==
Bandung, the capital of West Java province, is located about 145 kilometres (90 mi) southeast of Jakarta. Its elevation is 768 metres (2,520 ft) above sea level and is surrounded by up to 2,400 metres (7,900 feet) high Late Tertiary and Quaternary volcanic terrain. The 400 km^{2} (150 sq mi) flat of central Bandung plain is situated in the middle of 2,340.88 square kilometres (903.82 sq mi) wide of the Bandung Basin; the basin comprises Bandung, the Cimahi city, part of Bandung Regency, part of West Bandung Regency, and part of Sumedang Regency. The basin's main river is the Citarum; one of its branches, the Cikapundung, divides Bandung from north to south before it merges with Citarum again in Dayeuhkolot. The Bandung Basin is an essential source of water for potable water, irrigation, and fisheries, with its 6,147 million m^{3} (217.1 billion cu ft) of groundwater being a significant reservoir for the city.

The northern section of Bandung is hillier than other parts of the city, and the unique truncated flat-peak shape of the Tangkuban Perahu volcano (Tangkuban Parahu literally means 'upside-down boat') can be seen from the city to the north. Long-term volcanic activity has created fertile andisol soil in the north, suitable for intensive rice, fruit, tea, tobacco, and coffee plantations. In the south and east, alluvial soils deposited by the Cikapundung river predominate.

Geological data show that the Bandung Basin is located on an ancient volcano, known as Mount Sunda, erected up to 3,000–4,000 metres (9,800–13,100 feet) during the Pleistocene age. Two large-scale eruptions took place; the first formed the basin, and the second (est. 55,000 BCE) blocked the Citarum river, turning the basin into a lake known as "the Great Prehistoric Lake of Bandung". The lake drained away; for reasons which are the subject of ongoing debate among geologists.

=== Architecture ===
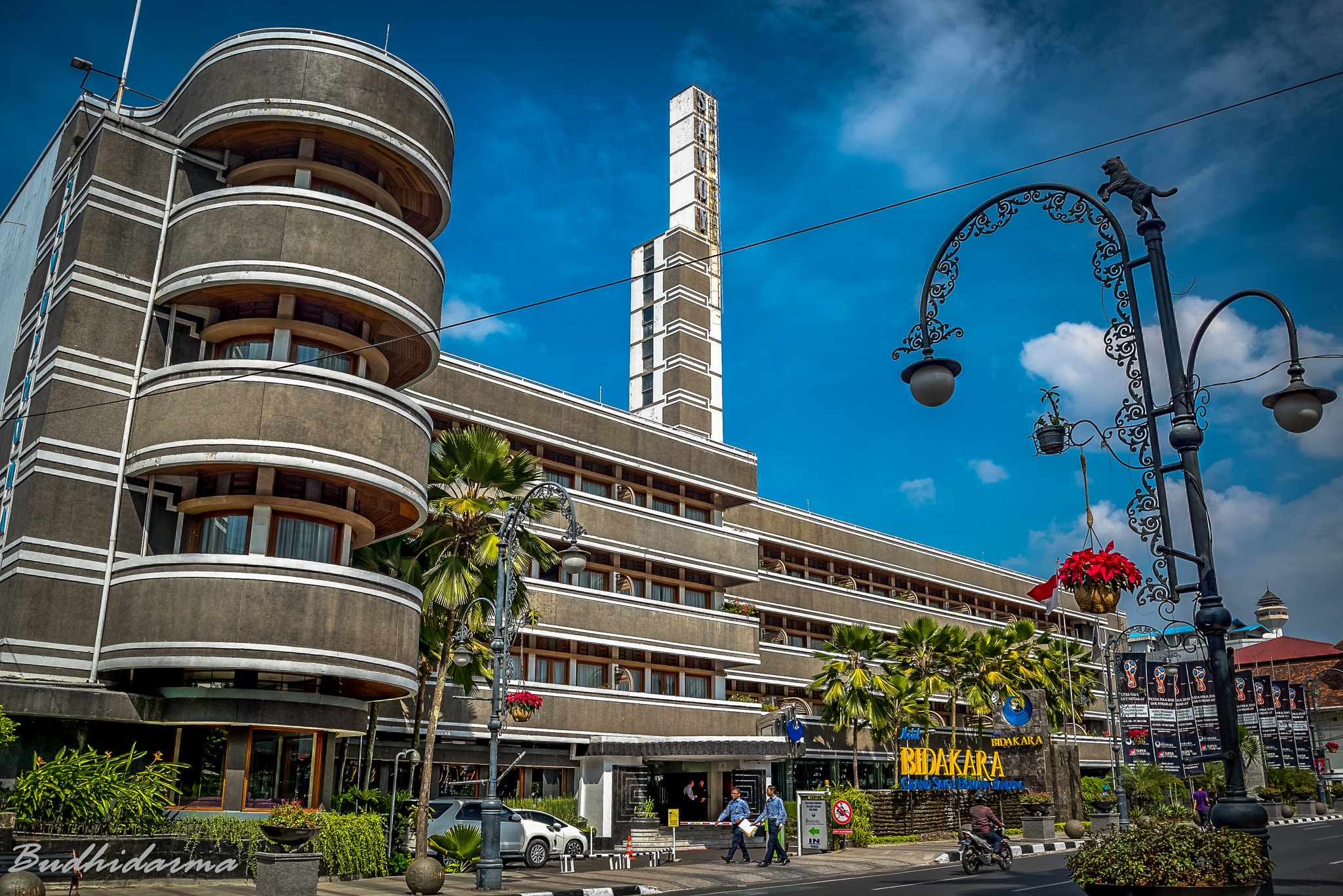
The Savoy Homann Bidakara Hotel architectural design by Albert Aalbers in 1939 is one of the most significant examples of the Art Deco style for which Bandung is renowned.

Bandung is home to numerous examples of Dutch colonial architecture, most notably the tropical Art Deco, dubbed New Indies Style. Henri Maclaine Pont was among the first Dutch architects to recognize the importance of combining each architectural style with local cultural traditions. He stressed that modern architecture should interact with local history and native elements. In 1920, Pont planned and designed buildings for the first technical university in the Dutch East Indies, Technische Hogeschool te Bandung (the present-day Bandung Institute of Technology). He was named a Professor of Architecture at the university. A striking local Sundanese roof style is seen adorning the top of the campus' ceremonial hall and is embedded in his artwork.

In the same year, another Dutch architect J Gerber designed Gouverments Bedrijven (Government Companies) in line with the colonial government's plan to move the capital from Batavia to Bandung. The building is known as Gedung Sate, named after the distinguished small satay-shaped structure on the roof, and is today used as the head office of the West Java provincial government and House of Representatives. The building is an example of a harmonious mixture between West and East architectural styles, particularly the Italian Renaissance style of arch structures in the wings and pendopo-like structures commonly found in Java in the middle section.

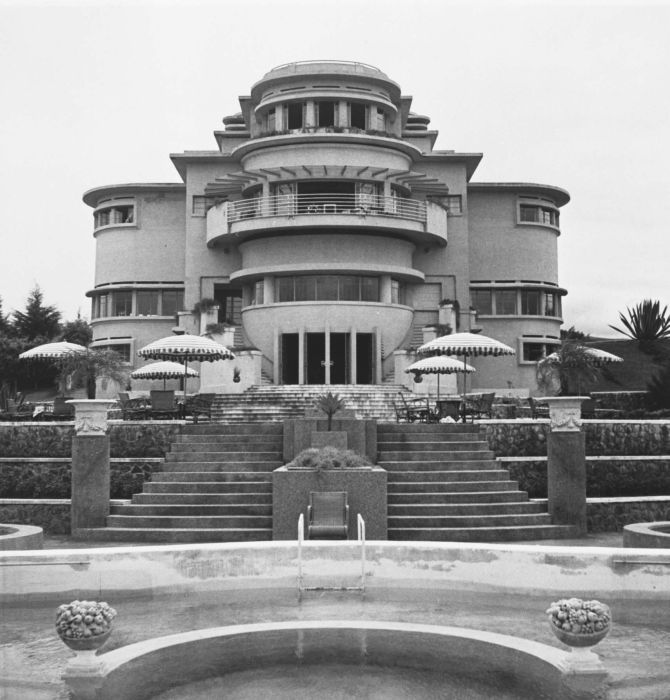
Villa Isola, is an art-deco building in the northern part of Bandung, now it serves as the rectorate building of Indonesia University of Education.

Several Dutch architects who shaped the city landmarks the architectural blending of modern and native traditions. In the 1930s, Bandung became known as an architectural laboratory due to the many Dutch architects who experimented with new architectural designs. Albert Aalbers added the streamline moderne style to the Art Deco by designing the DENIS bank (1936) and renovating the Savoy Homann Hotel (1939). Charles Prosper Wolff Schoemaker was one of the architects who enormously added native elements in his artworks, including the Villa Isola (1932), Hotel Preanger (1929), the regional military headquarters (1918), Gedung Merdeka (1921) and ITB Rectorate Building (1925).

Though Bandung is known for its many old Dutch architecture buildings, the city is recently going through a high-rise building boom. There are more than 100 high rise buildings in the city, and many more are under construction or planned.

=== Environmental problems ===
The north of the city serves as a water reservoir for Bandung. However, the area has seen substantial residential development. Several attempts to protect this area have been made, including creating reserves such as the Juanda National Park and Punclut, but development continues. Regular flooding in Bandung's south also presents a real and dangerous ongoing problem.

From mid-2005, Bandung faced another environmental disaster when the city's landfill site was re-evaluated after a garbage slide in 2005 which buried a village, Kampung Gajah, beneath it, killing over a hundred people. The accumulation of 8,000 m^{3}/d (3,300 cu ft/ks) of domestic garbage causes severe air pollution by local burning, the spread of disease, and water contamination. The provincial government has failed in its attempts to solve the garbage issue. Nevertheless, it was awarded in 1997 and 2015 as the least polluted city in the country. Further, a regional award in 2017 was also given from ASEAN for the cleanest air among other major cities in ASEAN countries.

Bandung is also well known for its tornado hotspot. The first deadly tornado in the area occurred in Rancaekek (during the Dutch Occupation in 1933 where a tornado struck the town, killing 1 and injuring none, the funnel destroyed 17 homes and left 30 homes badly damaged, many trees were either snapped or downed. Another deadly tornado to occur on Bandung was on 18 December 2014, in Gedebage, the tornado struck the area in the afternoon. It left 85 houses either unroofed or destroyed, a large factory building suffered significant damage, a warehouse levelled and a library suffered roof loss, one person died due to crushed by a collapsed wall.

=== Climate ===
Bandung experiences a tropical monsoon climate (Köppen: Am) that closely borders a tropical rainforest climate (Af) as the driest month precipitation total is marginally below 60 millimetres (2.4 in). March and August are the wettest and driest months, respectively. The average temperature throughout the year tends to be cooler than most cities in Indonesia due to the influence of altitude. The average temperature throughout the year only has little variation due to its location near the equator.

Climate data for Bandung (Husein Sastranegara International Airport) (elevation 740 m or 2,430 ft, 2013–2023)
Month	Jan	Feb	Mar	Apr	May	Jun	Jul	Aug	Sep	Oct	Nov	Dec	Year
Mean daily maximum °C (°F)	28.0 (82.4)	27.7 (81.9)	28.7 (83.7)	28.9 (84.0)	28.9 (84.0)	28.7 (83.7)	28.6 (83.5)	29.3 (84.7)	30.0 (86.0)	30.0 (86.0)	29.1 (84.4)	28.5 (83.3)	28.9 (84.0)
Daily mean °C (°F)	24.2 (75.6)	24.0 (75.2)	24.5 (76.1)	24.8 (76.6)	24.6 (76.3)	24.2 (75.6)	23.8 (74.8)	24.0 (75.2)	24.6 (76.3)	24.9 (76.8)	24.7 (76.5)	24.4 (75.9)	24.4 (75.9)
Mean daily minimum °C (°F)	20.4 (68.7)	20.3 (68.5)	20.4 (68.7)	20.7 (69.3)	20.3 (68.5)	19.7 (67.5)	19.0 (66.2)	18.6 (65.5)	19.2 (66.6)	19.9 (67.8)	20.3 (68.5)	20.3 (68.5)	19.9 (67.9)
Average rainfall mm (inches)	174.8 (6.88)	199.9 (7.87)	343.2 (13.51)	275.5 (10.85)	212.5 (8.37)	109.9 (4.33)	77.0 (3.03)	59.8 (2.35)	85.3 (3.36)	174.9 (6.89)	329.5 (12.97)	273.8 (10.78)	2,316.1 (91.19)
Average rainy days	14.4	15.3	19.3	18.3	13.9	9.2	7.0	6.0	7.0	13.0	8.5	18.1	150
Mean monthly sunshine hours	155	168	186	210	217	240	248	248	210	217	180	186	2,465
Source 1: Meteomanz
Source 2: Sistema de Clasificación Bioclimática Mundial (extremes and humidity) Weather Atlas

== Government ==
The city area in 1906 was 19.22 square kilometres (7.42 square miles), and by 1987, it had expanded to 167.2965 km^{2}. The city administration is divided into 30 districts (kecamatan) and 153 villages (kelurahan). For development purposes, the 30 districts are grouped into eight sub-city regions. The sub-city regions of Bandung are Arcamanik, Cibeunying, Kerees, Kordon, Gedebage, Ujungberung, Bojonagara and Tegalega. The mayor (walikota) - Bambang Tirtoyuliono from 2023 - leads the city administration. Since 2008, city residents have directly voted for a mayor; previously, mayors were nominated and selected by the city council - the Bandung City Regional House of Representatives (DPRD Kota Bandung), which has 50 members. As of 2003, the total number of city administration personnel was 20,163.

=== Administrative divisions ===
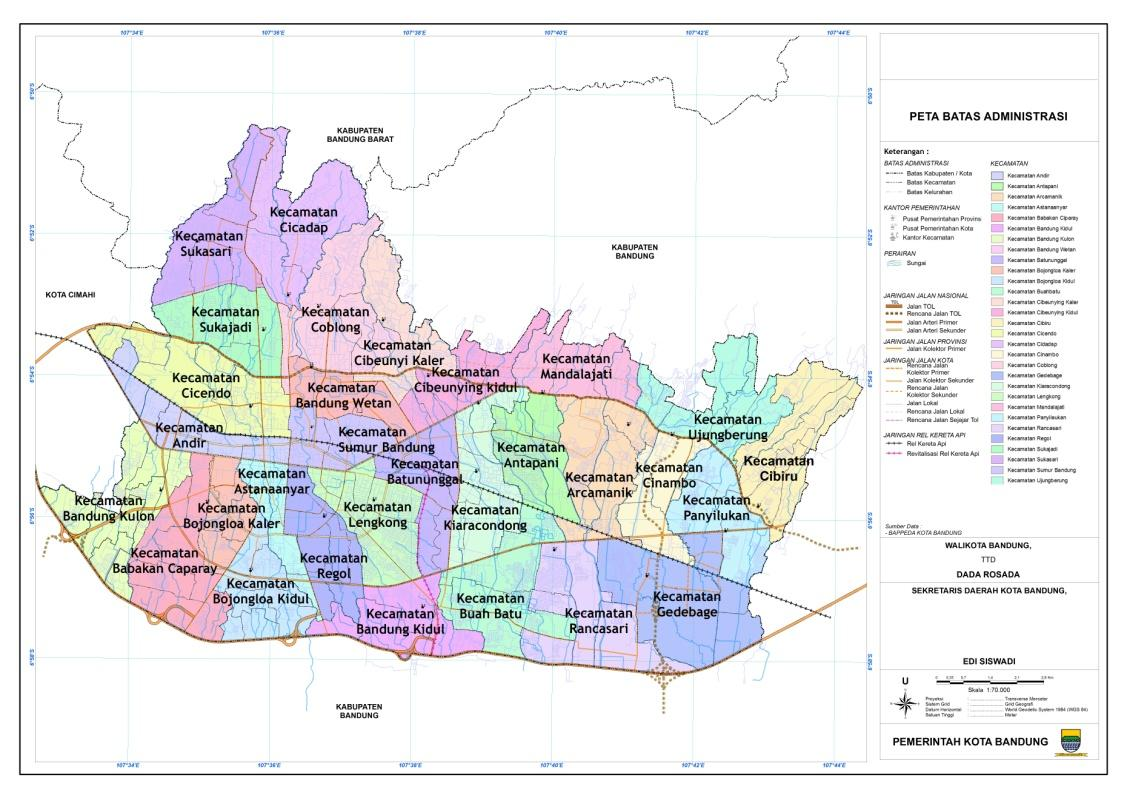
Villages (kelurahan) of Bandung, with all villages in the same district (kecamatan) having the same color.

Bandung City is divided into 30 districts (kecamatan), listed below with their areas and their populations at the 2010 Census and 2020 Census, together with the official estimates as at mid 2022. The table also includes the locations of the district administrative centres, the numbers of administrative villages (totaling 151, all classed as urban kelurahan) in each district, and its postal codes.

Kode Wilayah	Name of District (kecamatan)	Area in km^{2}	Pop'n 2010 Census	Pop'n 2020 Census	Pop'n mid 2023 Estimate	Admin centre	No. of kelurahan	Post codes
Arcamanik region ᮃᮁᮎᮙᮔᮤᮊ᮪
32.73.24	Arcamanik ᮃᮁᮎᮙᮔᮤᮊ᮪	5.87	65,607	77,214	82,025	Cisaranten Kulon ᮎᮤᮞᮛᮔ᮪ᮒᮨᮔ᮪ ᮊᮥᮜᮧᮔ᮪	4	40293 - 40294
32.73.20	Antapani ᮃᮔ᮪ᮒᮕᮔᮤ	3.79	72,006	79,260	82,578	Antapani Wetan ᮃᮔ᮪ᮒᮤᮕᮒᮤ ᮝᮦᮒᮔ᮪	4	40291
32.73.30	Mandalajati ᮙᮔ᮪ᮓᮜᮏᮒᮤ	6.67	60,825	71,422	73,821	Karang Pamulang ᮊᮛᮀ ᮕᮙᮥᮜᮀ	4	40195
Bojonagara region ᮘᮧᮏᮧᮔᮌᮛ
32.73.05	Andir ᮃᮔ᮪ᮓᮤᮁ	3.71	94,361	96,262	98,102	Garuda ᮌᮛᮥᮓ	6	40181 - 40184
32.73.06	Cicendo ᮎᮤᮎᮦᮔ᮪ᮓᮧ	6.86	96,491	92,327	93,549	Arjuna ᮃᮁᮏᮥᮔ	6	40171 - 40175
32.73.07	Sukajadi ᮞᮥᮊᮏᮓᮤ	4.30	104,805	100,668	102,000	Sukagalih ᮞᮥᮊᮌᮜᮤᮂ	5	40161 - 40164
32.73.01	Sukasari ᮞᮥᮊᮞᮛᮤ	6.27	79,211	74,886	75,877	Sukarasa ᮞᮥᮊᮛᮞ	4	40151 - 40154
Cibeunying region ᮎᮤᮘᮩᮑᮤᮀ
32.73.09	Bandung Wétan ᮘᮔ᮪ᮓᮥᮀ ᮝᮦᮒᮔ᮪	3.39	29,807	26,854	27,209	Tamansari ᮒᮙᮔ᮪ᮞᮛᮤ	3	40114 - 40116
32.73.18	Cibeunying Kaler ᮎᮤᮘᮩᮑᮤᮀ ᮊᮜᮦᮁ	4.50	68,807	67,104	67,992	Cigadung ᮎᮤᮌᮓᮥᮀ	4	40122 - 40191
32.73.14	Cibeunying Kidul ᮎᮤᮘᮩᮑᮤᮀ ᮊᮤᮓᮥᮜ᮪	5.25	104,575	107,389	109,652	Cikutra ᮎᮤᮊᮥᮒᮢ	6	40121 - 40192
32.73.08	Cidadap ᮎᮤᮓᮓᮕ᮪	6.11	56,325	52,702	53,399	Hegarmanah ᮠᮦᮌᮁᮙᮔᮂ	3	40141 - 40143
32.73.02	Coblong ᮎᮧᮘᮣᮧᮀ	7.35	127,588	110,205	111,663	Dago ᮓᮌᮧ	6	40131 - 40135
32.73.19	Sumur Bandung ᮞᮥᮙᮥᮁ ᮘᮔ᮪ᮓᮥᮀ	3.40	34,486	34,137	34,589	Merdeka ᮙᮨᮁᮓᮦᮊ	4	40111 - 40117
Gedébagé region ᮌᮨᮓᮦᮘᮌᮦ
32.73.23	Rancasari ᮛᮔ᮪ᮎᮞᮛᮤ	7.33	72,406	83,655	88,391	Cipamokolan ᮎᮤᮕᮙᮧᮊᮧᮜᮔ᮪	4	40292 - 40295
32.73.27	Gedébagé ᮌᮨᮓᮦᮘᮌᮦ	9.58	34,299	41,653	44,653	Rancabolang ᮛᮔ᮪ᮎᮘᮧᮜᮀ	4	40294
Karéés region ᮊᮛᮦᮆᮞ᮪
32.73.12	Batununggal ᮘᮒᮥᮔᮥᮀᮌᮜ᮪	5.03	116,935	115,501	117,030	Gumuruh ᮌᮥᮙᮥᮛᮥᮂ	8	40271 - 40275
32.73.16	Kiaracondong ᮊᮤᮃᮛᮎᮧᮔ᮪ᮓᮧᮀ	6.12	127,616	126,657	128,333	Babakan Sari ᮘᮘᮊᮔ᮪ ᮞᮛᮤ	6	40281 - 40285
32.73.13	Lengkong ᮜᮦᮀᮊᮧᮀ	5.90	69,307	66,231	67,108	Malabar ᮙᮜᮘᮁ	7	40261 - 40265
32.73.11	Regol ᮛᮦᮌᮧᮜ᮪	4.30	79,316	79,136	80,183	Ciseureuh ᮎᮤᮞᮩᮛᮩᮂ	7	40251 - 40255
Kordon region ᮊᮧᮁᮓᮧᮔ᮪
32.73.21	Bandung Kidul ᮘᮔ᮪ᮓᮥᮀ ᮊᮤᮓᮥᮜ᮪	6.06	57,398	59,984	61.560	Mengger ᮙᮦᮀᮌᮦᮁ	4	40256 - 40287
32.73.22	Buah Batu ᮘᮥᮃᮂ ᮘᮒᮥ	7.93	92,140	100,360	104,255	Margasari ᮙᮁᮌᮞᮛᮤ	4	40286 - 40287
Tegalega region ᮒᮨᮌᮜᮨᮌ
32.73.15	Bandung Kulon ᮘᮔ᮪ᮓᮥᮀ ᮊᮥᮜᮧᮔ᮪	6.46	138,644	138,813	140,700	Caringin ᮎᮛᮤᮍᮤᮔ᮪	8	40211 - 40215
32.73.03	Babakan Ciparay ᮘᮘᮊᮔ᮪ ᮎᮤᮕᮛᮚ᮪	7.45	143,203	142,440	144,327	Babakan Ciparay ᮘᮘᮊᮔ᮪ ᮎᮤᮕᮛᮚ᮪	6	40221 - 40227
32.73.04	Bojongloa Kaler ᮘᮧᮏᮧᮀᮜᮧᮃ ᮊᮜᮦᮁ	3.03	117,218	119,193	121,358	Suka Asih ᮞᮥᮊ ᮃᮞᮤᮂ	5	40231 - 40233
32.73.17	Bojongloa Kidul ᮘᮧᮏᮧᮀᮜᮧᮃ ᮊᮤᮓᮥᮜ᮪	6.26	83,600	86,740	88,834	Situsaeur ᮞᮤᮒᮥᮞᮉᮁ	6	40234 - 40239
32.73.10	Astana Anyar ᮃᮞ᮪ᮒᮔ ᮃᮑᮁ	2.89	66,658	68,315	69,714	Panjunan ᮕᮔ᮪ᮏᮩᮔᮔ᮪	6	40241 - 40243
Ujungberung region ᮅᮏᮥᮀᮘᮨᮛᮥᮀ
32.73.25	Cibiru ᮎᮤᮘᮤᮛᮥ	6.32	67,412	72,090	74,481	Cipadung ᮎᮤᮕᮓᮥᮀ	4	40614 - 40615
32.73.28	Panyileukan ᮕᮑᮤᮜᮩᮊᮔ᮪	5.10	37,691	39,892	41,091	Mekar Mulya ᮙᮨᮊᮁ ᮙᮥᮜ᮪ᮚ	4	40614
32.73.26	Ujungberung ᮅᮏᮥᮀᮘᮨᮛᮥᮀ	6.40	72,414	87,698	93,939	Cigending ᮎᮤᮌᮨᮔ᮪ᮓᮤᮀ	5	40611 - 40619
32.73.29	Cinambo ᮎᮤᮔᮙ᮪ᮘᮧ	3.68	23,762	25,363	26,190	Pakemitan ᮕᮊᮨᮙᮤᮒᮔ᮪	4	40296

== Economy ==
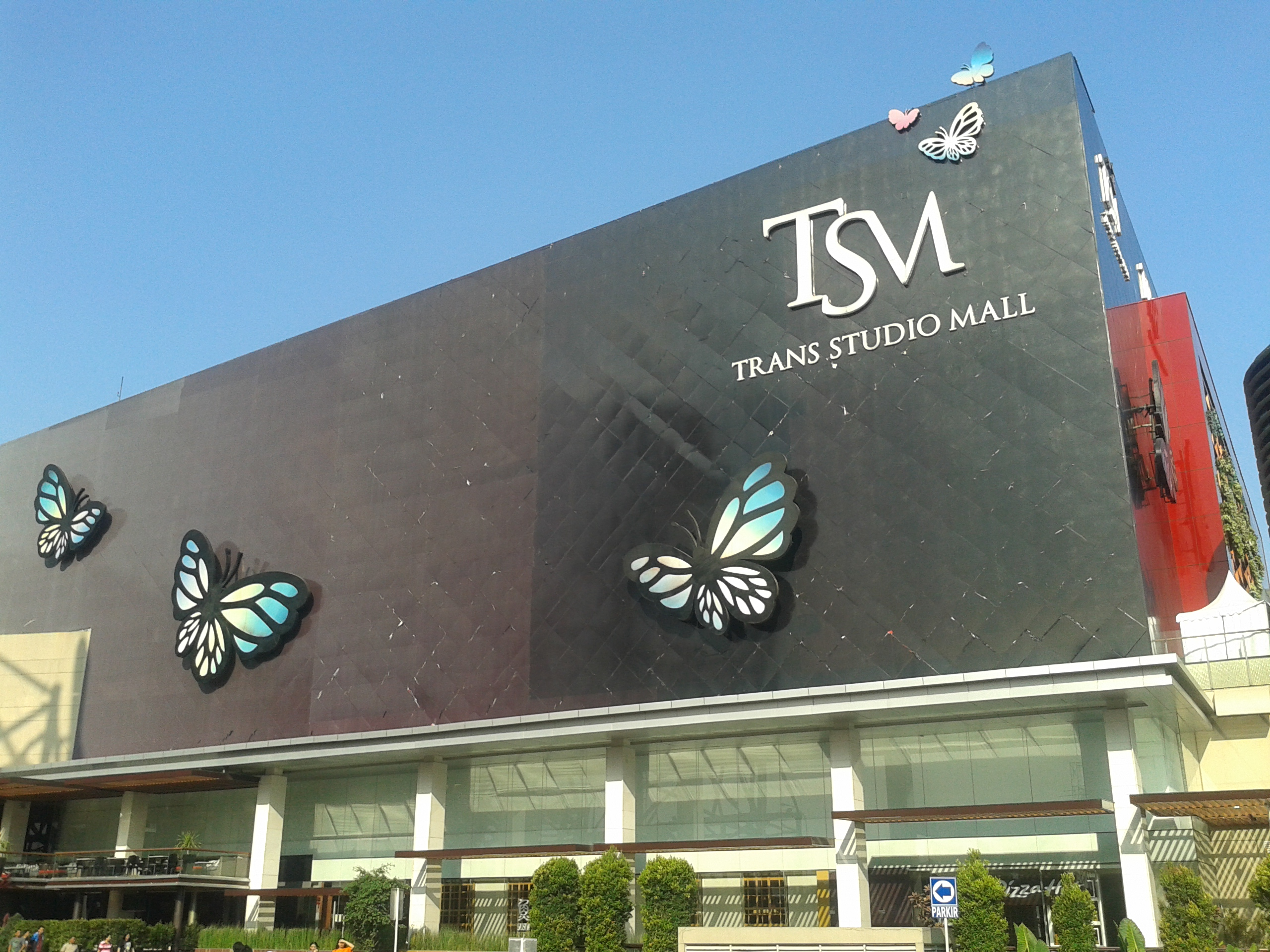
Trans Studio Mall Bandung, is one of the popular shopping malls in Bandung.

The city's economy is mainly built upon tourism, business, creative industry, high-tech and manufacturing industries, educational institutions, technology, retail services, financial services, pharmaceutical companies, and food production. The once quiet residential district of Dago has become an important business and entertainment centre with chic cafés and restaurants spread out along Jalan Dago. In the early 1990s, Jalan Cihampelas became a popular clothing store location and remains so today. Some important shopping malls of the city which are Trans Studio Mall Bandung, Summarecon Mall Bandung, Bandung Indah Plaza, Cihampelas Walk, Paris Van Java Mall, and 23 Paskal Shopping Center are among the popular shopping centres in Bandung.

Creative culture has shaped specific parts of the city's economy. Small businesses, known as "distro", sell non-trademarked products made by local designers. Typical distro products are books, indie label records, magazines, fashion products, and other accessories. Distros are popular with young people and distance themselves from factory outlets in terms of philosophy. They arise from individual designers and young entrepreneurs, while factory outlet products generally come from large-scale garment factories.

The city administration has agreed to substantially develop seven industrial and trade areas for Bandung specialty products. These include Binong Jati Knitting Industrial and Trade Center, Cigondewah Textile Trade Center, Cihampelas Jeans Trade Center, Suci (T and Oblong) Shirt Industrial Center, Cibaduyut Shoes Industrial Center, Cibuntu Tofu and Tempeh Industrial Center, Sukamulya Sukajadi Doll Industrial Center.

=== Tourism ===
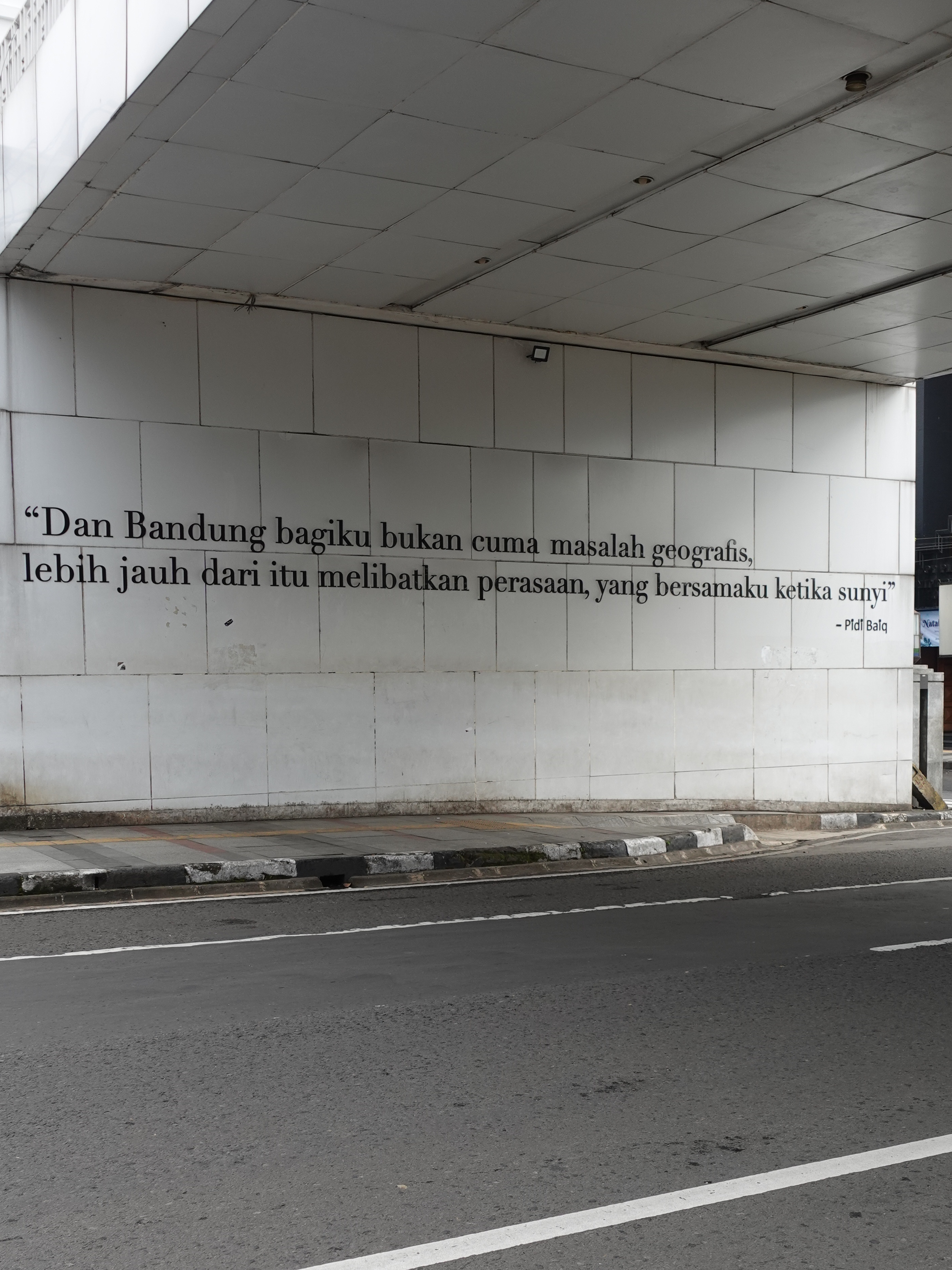
The Asian-African Street Tunnel is an iconic place in Bandung with quotes about the city's beauty.

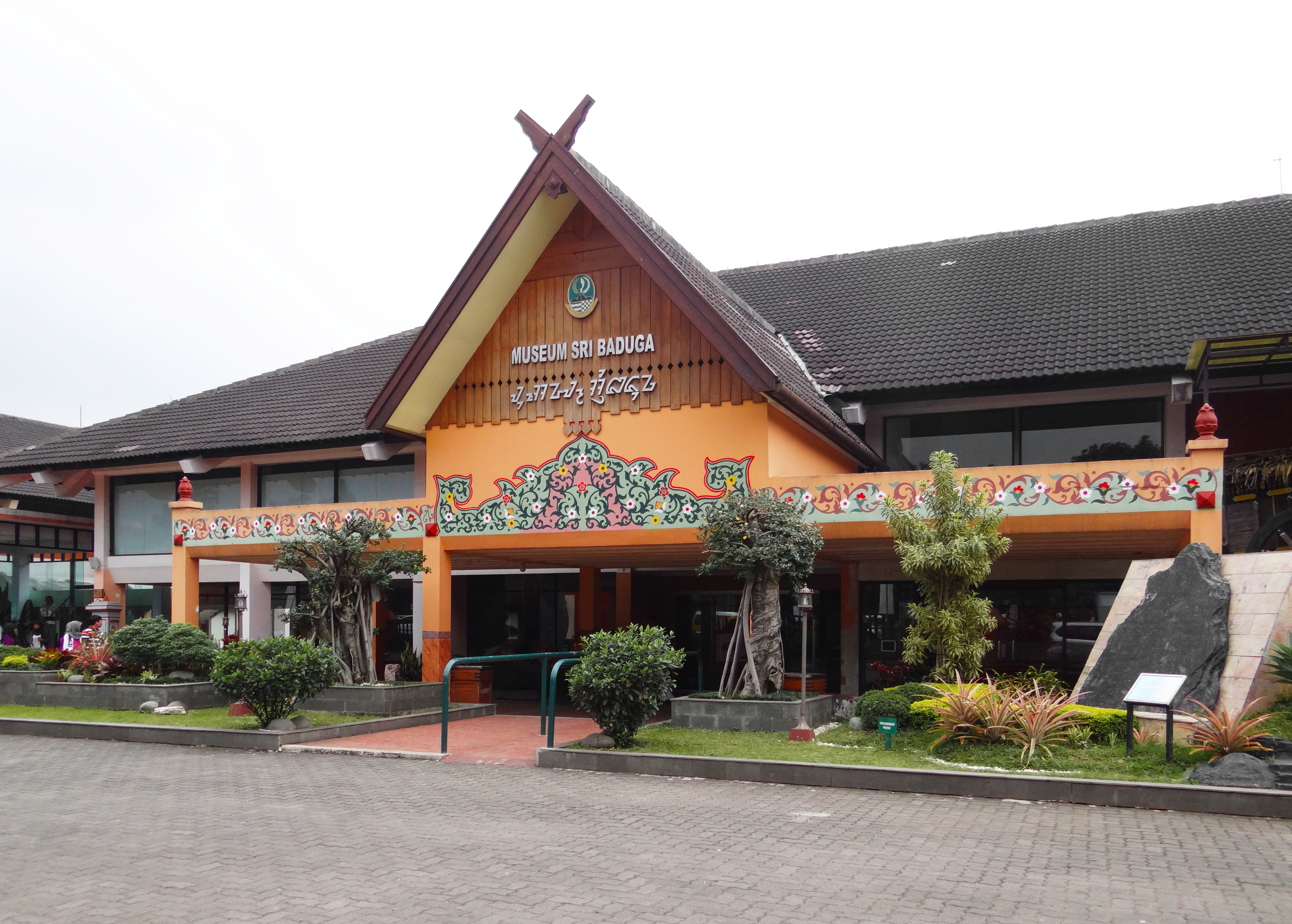
The museum of Sri Baduga, whose name is dedicated to the historical figure of Sri Baduga Maharaja.

Bandung is a popular weekend destination for residents of Jakarta. The colder climate of the highland plantation area, variety of food, less expensive fashion shops located in factory outlets and distros, golf courses, and the zoo, are some of the attractions of the city. Bandung is also a popular shopping destination due to the cheap textile and fashion products, especially for Malaysian and Singaporean tourists.

In the 1990s, local designers opened denim clothing stores along Jalan Cihampelas, which was transformed into a "jeans street". The city attracts people from other big cities to buy local fashion wares, as they are cheaper than branded items. Beside Jalan Cihampelas, many factory outlets also opened at Jalan Riau, Jalan Braga, Jalan Setiabudi, and Jalan Djuanda (known as Dago). Textile factories on the outskirts of Bandung have opened factory outlets on site selling what is marketed as sisa export (rejected or over-produced export quality items).

Significant tourist sites near Bandung include the Tangkuban Prahu volcano crater to the north, the Kawah Putih volcano lake, and Patenggang Lake, a lake surrounded by tea plantations about 50 kilometres (31 miles) to the south of the city.

To view the Bandung Basin clearly in its mountain surroundings, visitors travel to the Bongkor protected forest area (kawasan hutan lindung), Saung Daweung and Arcamanik; to the slopes of West Manglayang Mountain in an area known as Caringin Tilu, with entry from Padasuka and Cicaheum to the north. The forest is located in 1,500 metres (4,900 feet) above sea level and is covered with pine trees managed by a government corporation Perhutani and can be accessed with 30 minutes drive from downtown. Visitors going to the north of the city also find Taman Hutan Raya Ir. H. Djuanda. The Cicaheum area also hosts Bukit Moko, a tourist spot famous for its views and its steel statue of a giant star called Puncak Bintang. Bandung has several museums that should be visited by tourists, such as the Geological Museum of Bandung, the Indonesia Postal Museum, Sri Baduga Museum, and the Asian-African Conference Museum. The city government operates Bandros, a tourist bus, since 2014.

== Demographics ==
Religion in Bandung (2023 Census)
1. Islam (92.3%)
2. Christianity (7.20%)
3. Buddhism (0.46%)
4. Hinduism (0.06%)
5. Others (0.01%)

Traditionally, Bandung's population is of Sundanese descent. Javanese are the most significant ethnic Indonesian minority and mostly come from the central and the eastern parts of Java. Other minorities include Minang, Minahasan, Chinese, Batak, Malay, Korean, Indian, and Arab. Bandung's population are mainly Muslims but there are communities of Christians, Hindus and Buddhists.

Year	2010	2015	2020	2023
Population	2,394,873	2,480,615	2,444,160	2,506,603
Population density (per km^{2})	14,314	14,826	14,609	14,982

In 2005, the population of Bandung was 2.29 million people with a density of 13,690/km^{2} (35,457/sq mi). The May 2010 census enumerated 2.395 million people and that of May 2020 enumerated 2.444 million. Based on data from Statistics Indonesia, the population of Bandung in mid 2023 was 2,506,603 (comprising 1,259,236 males and 1,247,367 females), making Bandung the third-most populous city in Indonesia.

== Culture ==
Bandung is a significant cultural hub in Indonesia. Most people in the surrounding province of West Java are ethnically Sundanese, with Sundanese often spoken as a first language, and the standard and informal language for communication in streets, school, work, and markets. As in the rest of the country, standard Indonesian serves as the lingua franca and primary language of government, business, media, and formal education.

=== Music ===
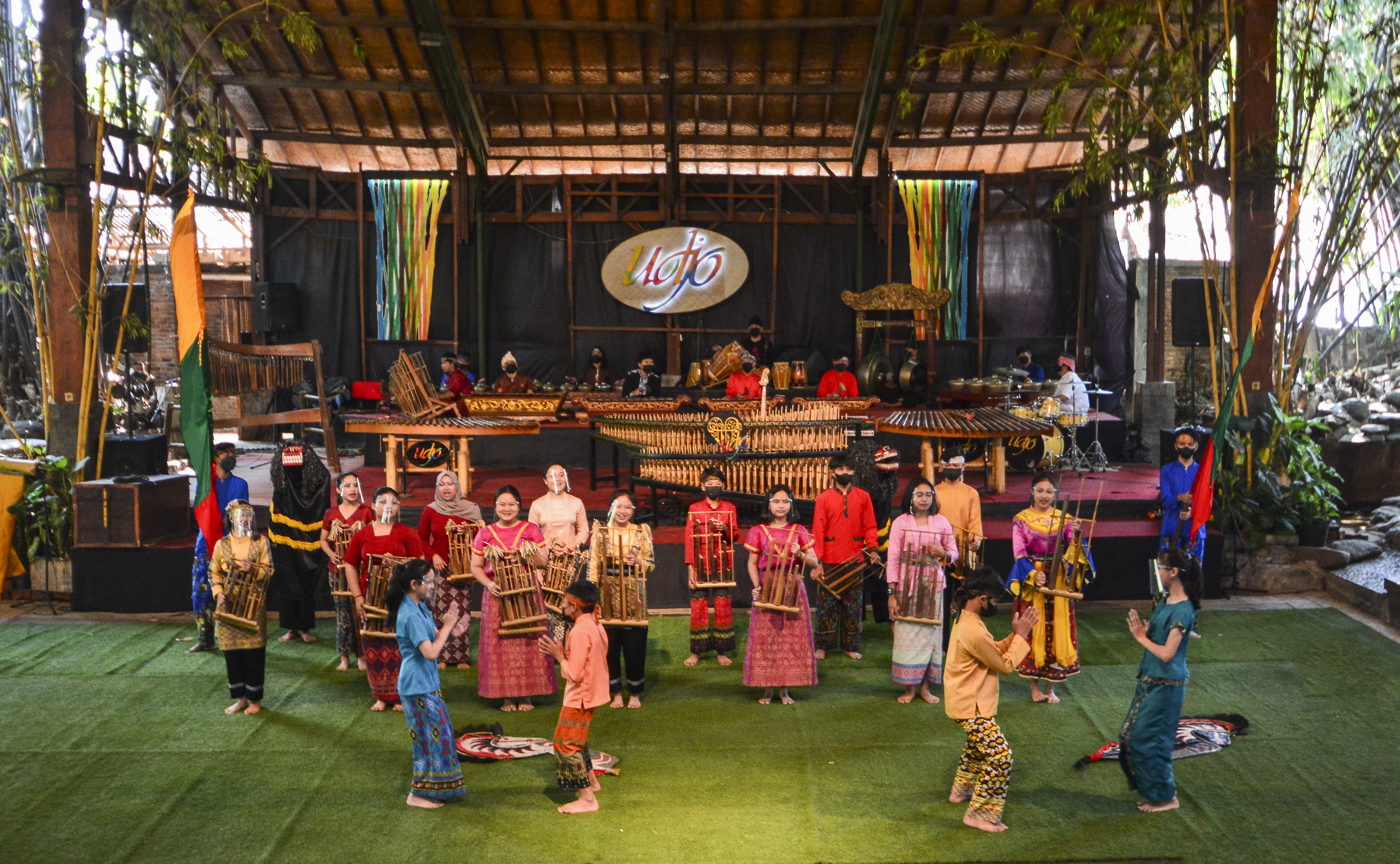
Angklung Performance at Saung Angklung Udjo in Bandung.

Bandung is one of the cities in Indonesia with a rich musical history, known for traditional instruments such as the Angklung, Suling, and Kacapi, which are commonly used in Tembang Sunda. Since the Dutch colonial era, Bandung has been the center of music in Indonesia. Bandung has notable UNESCO with creative cities with specially music band is majority founded over there.

Bands such as Kahitna, The Changcuters, Super Girlies, SM*SH, Yovie & Nuno, Noah, and Project Pop were founded and established in Bandung.

=== Sports ===
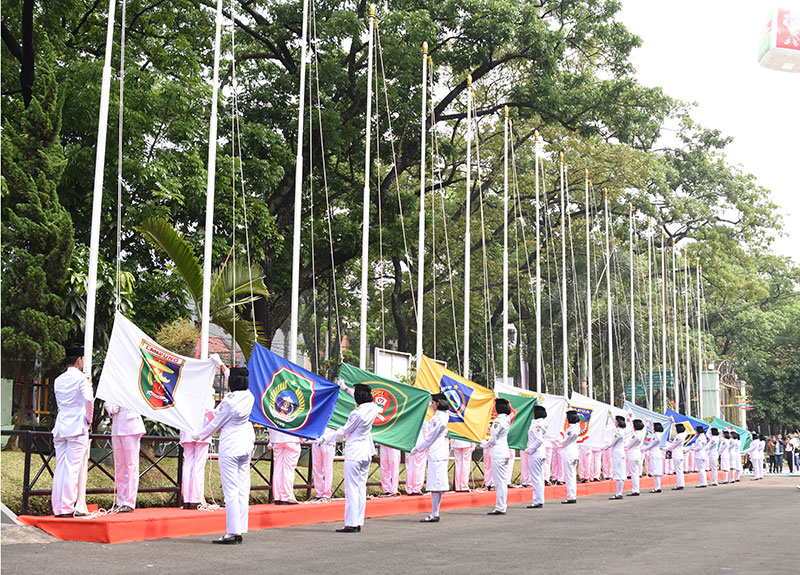
Opening National Paralympic Week 2016 (XV) in Siliwangi Stadium

Bandung is the home of Persib Bandung, a professional football club currently competing in the highest tier of Indonesian football, the Super League. Bandung is also home of Prawira Bandung (ex Garuda Bandung), a professional basketball club currently competes in the Indonesian Basketball League, with its home games in the GOR Citra Arena. The roads leading up to Lembang and Dago are popular routes for mountain cycling on weekends, as Jalan Ir. H. Djuanda and Jalan Buah Batu is zoned as car-free on Sunday mornings.

Other popular sports in Bandung include badminton and golf, with several golf courses surrounding the city.

=== Media ===
Bandung has several local daily newspapers, including Pikiran Rakyat, Galamedia, and Tribun Jabar. Several local television stations operate in Bandung, including TVRI Jawa Barat (a public regional station serving West Java, which headquartered in the city), Bandung TV, MQTV and PJTV. Many radio stations, such as Ardan FM, KLCBS, MQFM and OZ Radio, also broadcast from Bandung.

The city of Bandung was featured in the 9th and 10th leg of the American reality series The Amazing Race 23.

== Infrastructure ==
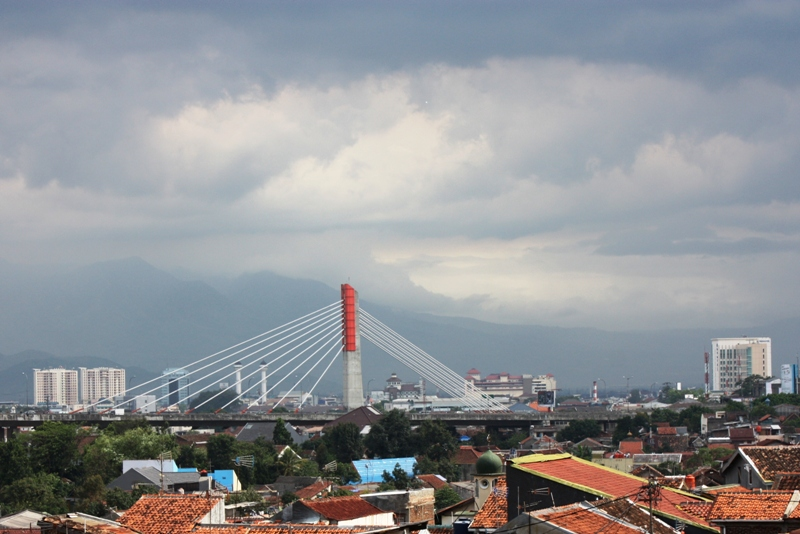
Pasupati Bridge is the most famous bridge in Bandung and second-longest bridge in Indonesia.

Bandung can be accessed by highways from Jakarta. An intercity toll highway called Cipularang Toll Road, connecting Jakarta, Karawang, Purwakarta, Padalarang and Bandung, was completed in May 2005, and is the fastest way to reach Bandung from the capital by road. Driving time is about 1.5 hours on average. There are three other options: the Puncak route (Jakarta-Cianjur/Sukabumi-Bandung), Purwakarta route (Jakarta-Cikampek-Purwakarta-Cikalong Wetan-Padalarang-Cimahi-Bandung) and the Subang route (Jakarta-Cikampek-Subang-Lembang-Bandung). From cities further east (Cirebon, Tasikmalaya and Central Java province), Bandung can be accessed through the main provincial road. Indonesian National Route 3 links Bandung with the rest of Java towards Cilegon and Ketapang (Banyuwangi).

The Pasupati Bridge was built to relieve traffic congestion in the city for east–west transport. The 2.8-kilometre (1.7 mi) cable-stayed bridge lies through the Cikapundung Valley. It is 30 to 60 metres (98 to 197 feet) wide and, after extensive delays, it was finally completed in June 2005, following financial investment from Kuwait. The bridge is part of Bandung's comprehensive inner-city highways plan.

=== Transportation ===
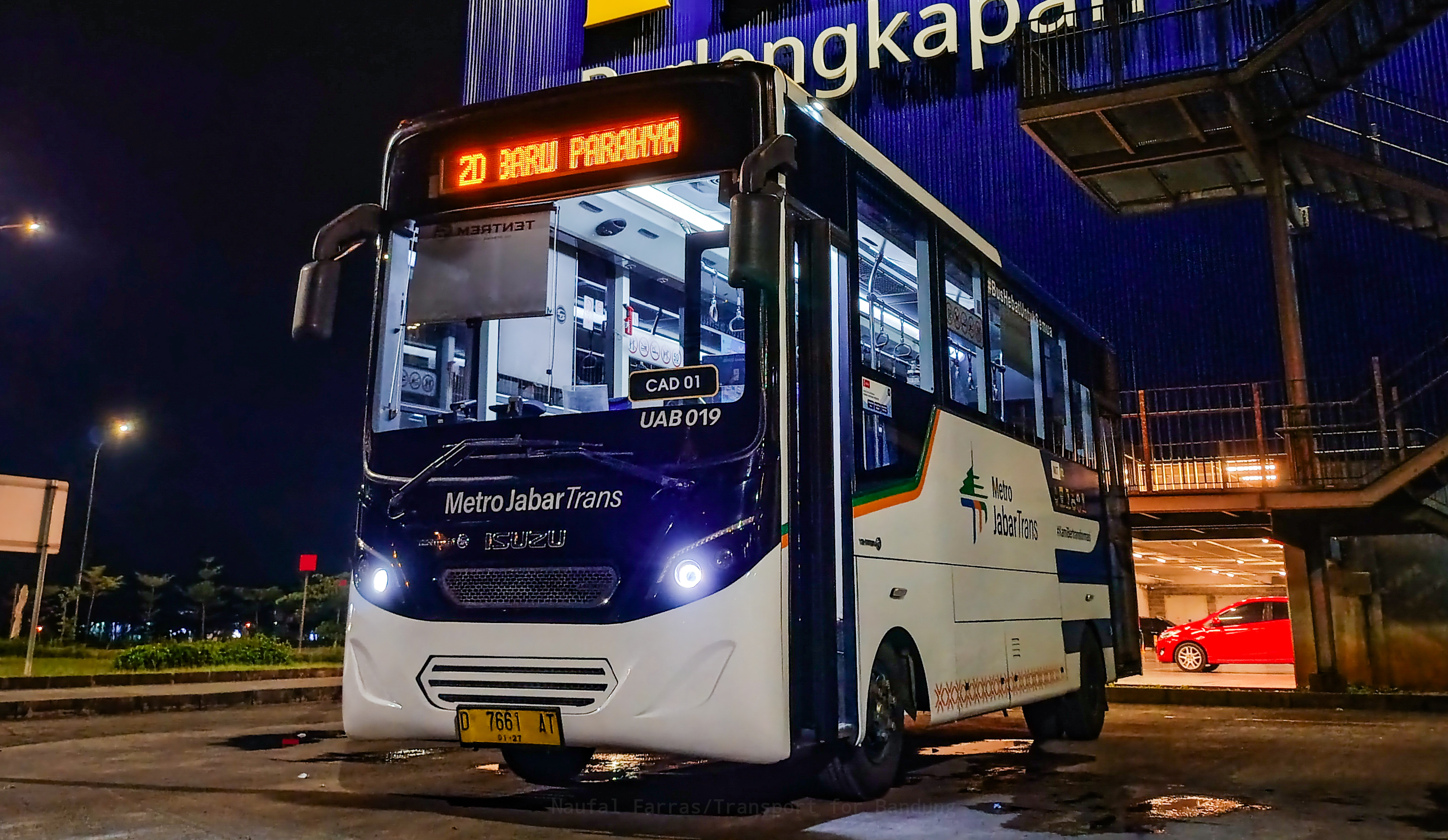
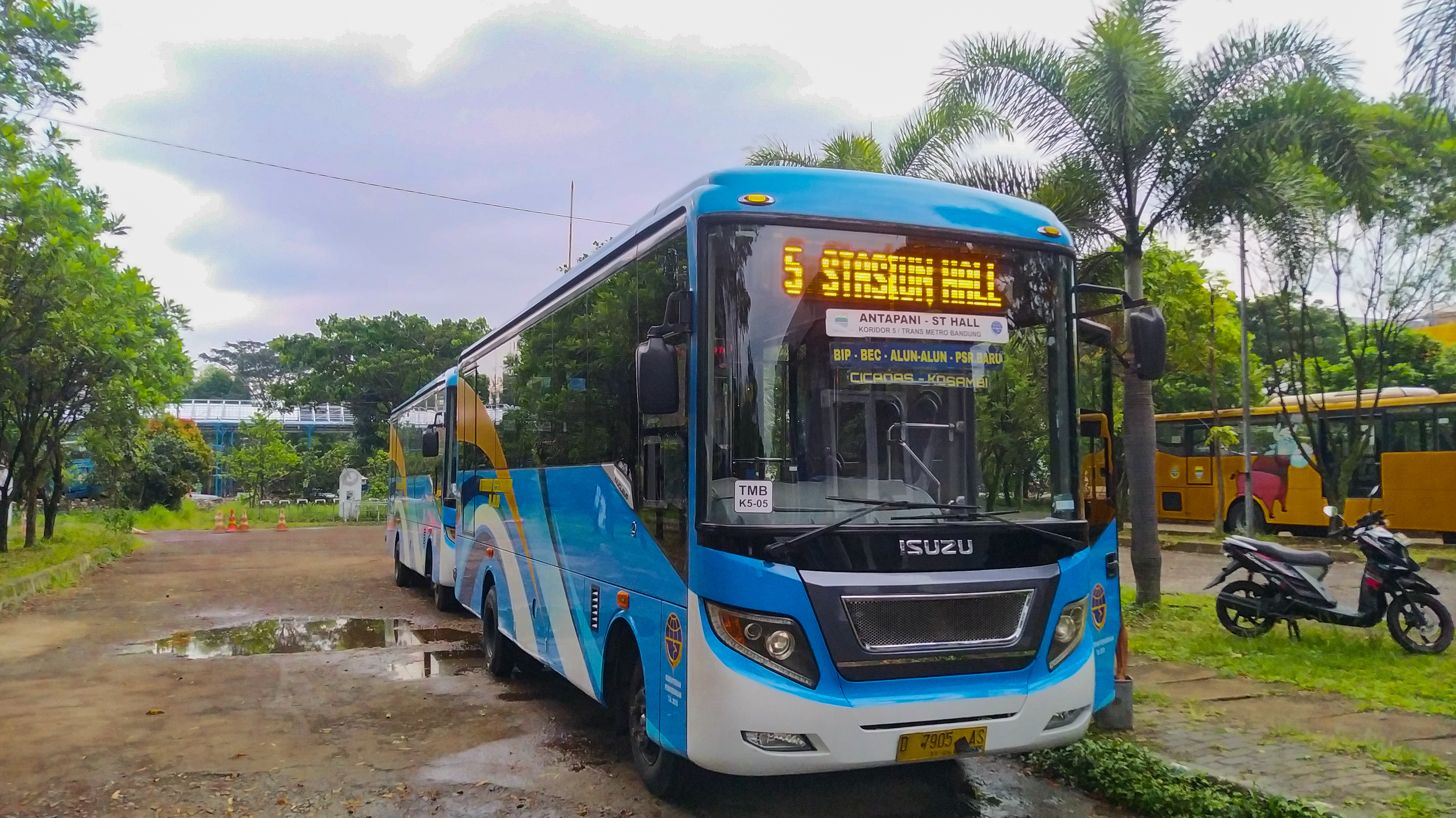
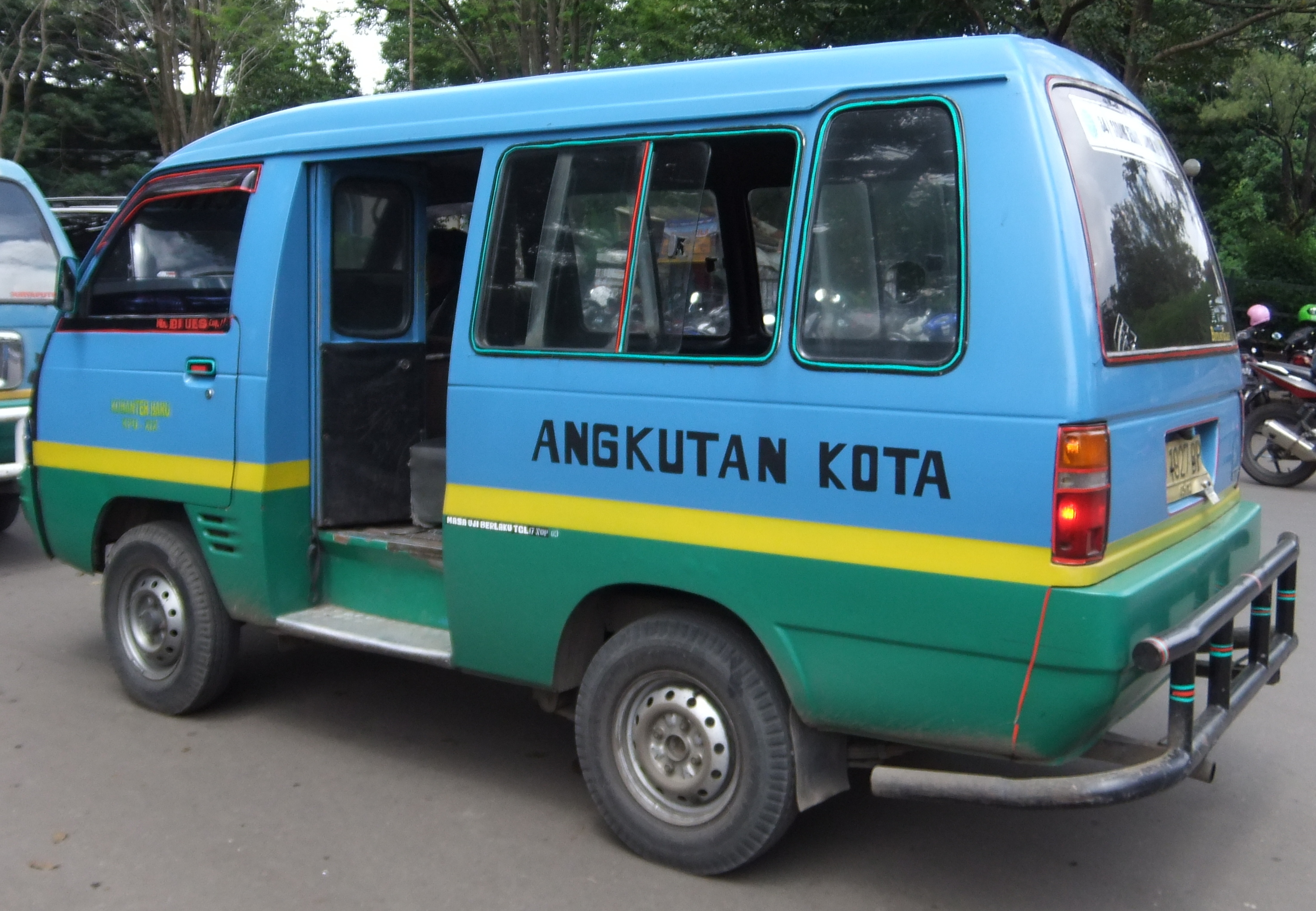
Various bus-based means of transport in Bandung; from up to down: Metro Jabar Trans, Trans Metro Bandung, and Share taxis

Bandung has one operating intercity bus terminals: Leuwipanjang, serving buses from the west, and two inactive bus terminals: Cicaheum, serving buses from the east, and Dago, serving buses from the north. Both are at full capacity and are to be replaced by a new terminal at Gedebage on 15 hectares (37 acres) land, after which the old terminals will function as inner-city terminals. The new terminal will be located next to the Gedebage railway station near Gedebage container dry port. On 26 June 2026, the Cicaheum Terminal stopped the intercity bus operation, to give way to the new depot for Bus rapid transit of Bandung, which would be located in the same spot.

Taxis and Carpooling are widely available. The primary means of public transportation is by angkot minibuses (from angkutan, "transportation" and kota, "city"); angkot are privately operated and serve multiple routes throughout the city, and although cheap, they are considered basic and uncomfortable. To find exact angkot routes, passengers may look for information available through the drivers or at terminals.

Due to the current extent of railway lines in Bandung, only two named regional railway services, Commuter Line Bandung Raya and Commuter Line Garut, are serving the city, serving a single line. It catered for the suburban areas east and west of the city such as Cimahi, Padalarang, Rancaekek, Cicalengka, as well as some other neighbouring towns such as Garut and Purwakarta. KAI Commuter took over the operations of both services from its mother company KAI in 2022, anticipating planned electrification of the route by Ministry of Transport.

Boseh is a dock-based bicycle-sharing system provided by the Transport Service (Dinas Perhubungan) of Bandung.

Public buses in Bandung and its surrounding urban area are operated by various operators, with a total 16 bus lines currently operating. DAMRI buses used to dominate as the main bus operator serving the city and its surrounding metropolitan area, first operating in the 1970s, with at some point operating more than 10 routes. However, it collapsed in October 2021, leaving 5 routes still operating. Following the example of TransJakarta, the city government introduced its own BRT system called Trans Metro Bandung on 24 September 2009. By 2022, it served 5 trunk corridors and 1 feeder routes. Both DAMRI and Trans Metro Bandung buses uses higher deck buses similar to TransJakarta, but could be stopped anywhere along its route and do not run separately from traffic.

Provincial government of West Java also operates a bus route called as Safe and Healthy Bus Rapid Transit (shortened Buratas), serving only a single line. As part of nationwide bus services modernization program called as Teman Bus, a more disciplined system branded as Trans Metro Pasundan was introduced by central government's Ministry of Transportation in December 2021. Two operators, Big Bird (part of Blue Bird Group) and DAMRI operated 5 routes inherited from former DAMRI routes under a contract with Ministry of Transport. Introduction of new bus routes in Bandung often faced resistance from angkots and extortion attempts by so-called local patrons due to perception that their revenues being stolen, leading to blockades and verbal threats against bus drivers. Due to fragmentation of brands and operators, passengers must pay again when transiting to other bus lines or to other modes such as trains. Only Trans Metro Pasundan has integrated tariff, enabling users not to pay again when transferring to other routes within the system.

A more comprehensive plan to revitalize the bus system will be implemented in 2024, extending from the Trans Metro Pasundan project. It would integrate all operators within a single system called Trans Bagja, with proper Bus Rapid Transit features such as dedicated lanes, frequent bus availability and bus stops. The planned system intended to use electric powered buses, both imported and locally produced. Bandung city government also operated a fleet of city tour buses called as Bandung Tour on Bus (shortened Bandros).

There are also many Artery Roads that connects the main city of Bandung to the suburbs of Bandung. Some examples are Jl. Ir. H. Djuanda, which connects from Surapati to Dago, and Jl. Moh. Toha, which connects from Tegallega to Dayeuhkolot. Some of the artery roads connects in the downtown area, such as the Pasupati Bridge, one of the landmarks of Bandung, and Jl. A. Yani, which connects Sumur Bandung to Cicaheum.

==== Rail-based ====
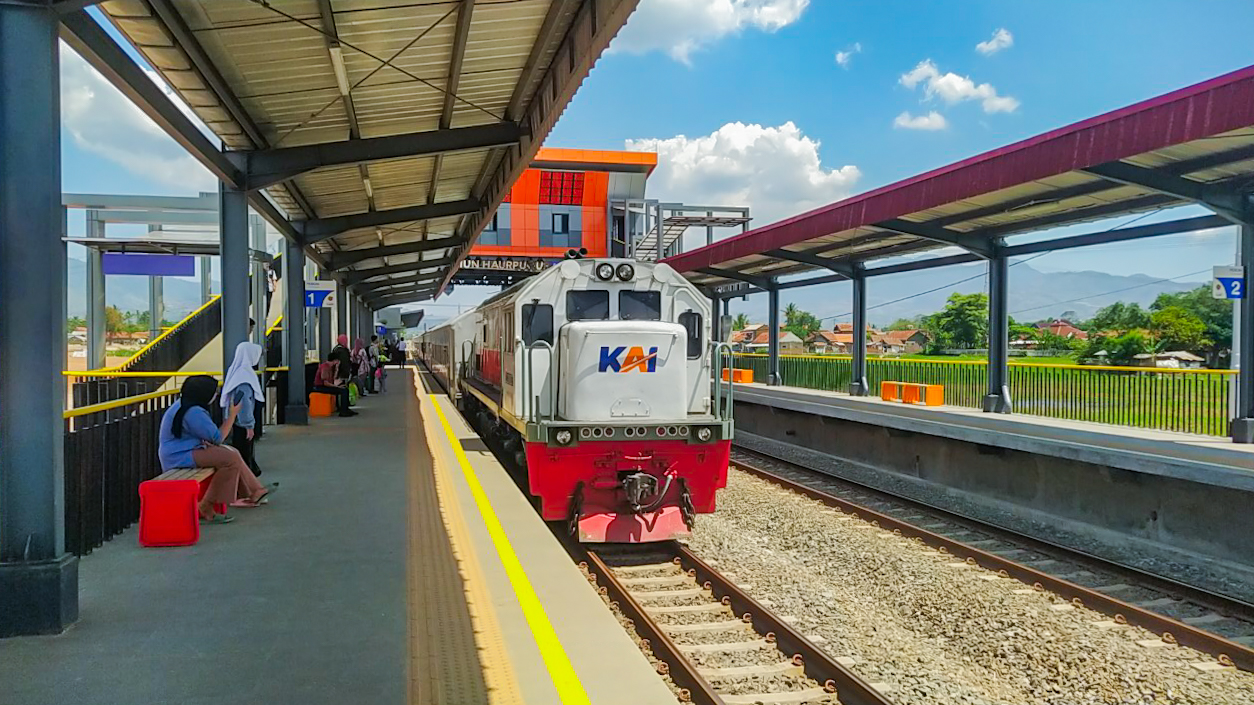
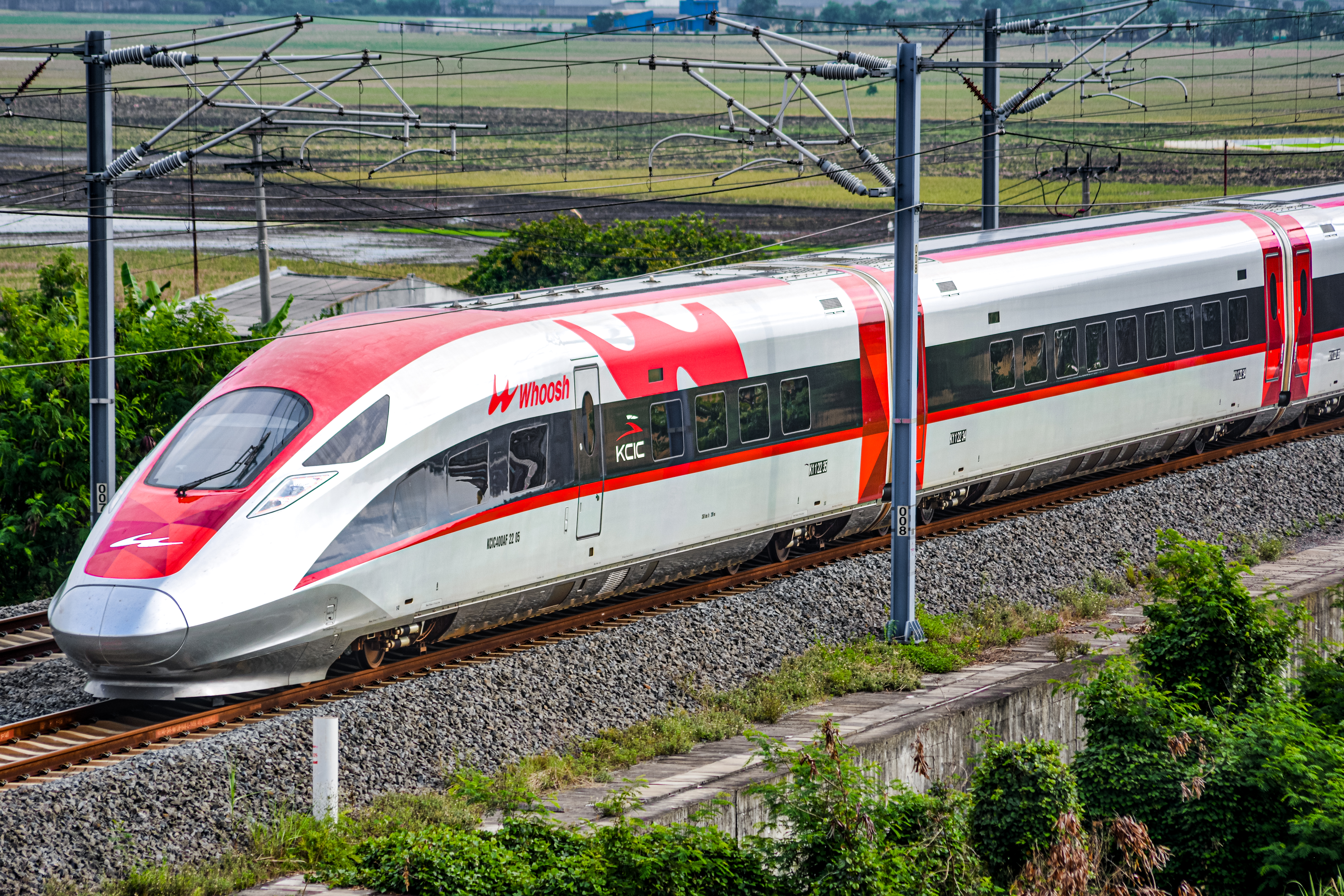
Various rail-based means of transport in Bandung; from up to down: Commuter rail, HSR

Bandung has two large railway stations, Bandung and Kiaracondong Stations. Other smaller stations are Cimindi, Andir, Ciroyom, Cikudapateuh, and Gedebage Stations. Railway lines connect Bandung to Cianjur, Jakarta, Purwakarta, Bekasi, Karawang, and Cikampek to the west, and Surabaya, Malang, Yogyakarta, and Solo to the east. The Whoosh high-speed rail line currently provides train service from nearby Padalarang and Tegalluar to Jakarta's Halim station. Due to constraints, stations serving Bandung are neither within Bandung city centre nor the limits of Bandung city. Instead, a feeder service will ply between Padalarang HSR station and the main Bandung station, using existing tracks.

==== Airport ====
Bandung's main airport is Husein Sastranegara International Airport (BDO), located near the Dirgantara aerospace complex and the Dirgantara Fairground. Redevelopment of the airport was completed in 2016. Kertajati International Airport (KJT) in Majalengka Regency was built as a new and larger second airport for the Greater Bandung area and to replace Husein Sastranegara, opening in June 2018, just in time for the 2018 Asian Games.

On 11 July 2023, Indonesian President Joko Widodo announced that Husein Sastranegara would be retired and all commercial flights moved to Kertajati from October 2023. Scheduled jet services ceased on 29 October 2023, after which the airport continued to handle propeller aircraft on intra-Java routes, military flights and flight-training activity.

In 2026, following persistently low passenger numbers at Kertajati, the government decided to reactivate Husein Sastranegara for commercial jet operations. A June 2026 letter from the Directorate General of Civil Aviation permits the airport to serve scheduled and non-scheduled domestic and international flights by both jet and propeller aircraft. As of July 2026, the Ministry of Transportation has prepared two reactivation scenarios: limited jet operations (business and charter flights) from 17 August 2026, and full operations serving Boeing 737-800 and Airbus A320 aircraft under a slot management system from 17 September 2026. Preparatory works include runway and taxiway overlays, apron reconstruction, terminal repairs, and upgrading the airport's rescue and firefighting capability from category 5 to category 7. According to Bandung mayor Muhammad Farhan, eight domestic routes are planned upon reopening: Medan, Padang, Pekanbaru, Batam, Balikpapan, Pontianak, Denpasar and Makassar. The government has stated that Kertajati will remain in operation and be developed as a hub for aviation-related industry, including aircraft maintenance facilities.

Soekarno–Hatta International Airport is also located 177 km (110 mi) north west of the city. Most residents would use Soekarno–Hatta International Airport as it provides more domestic and international destinations.

== Education ==
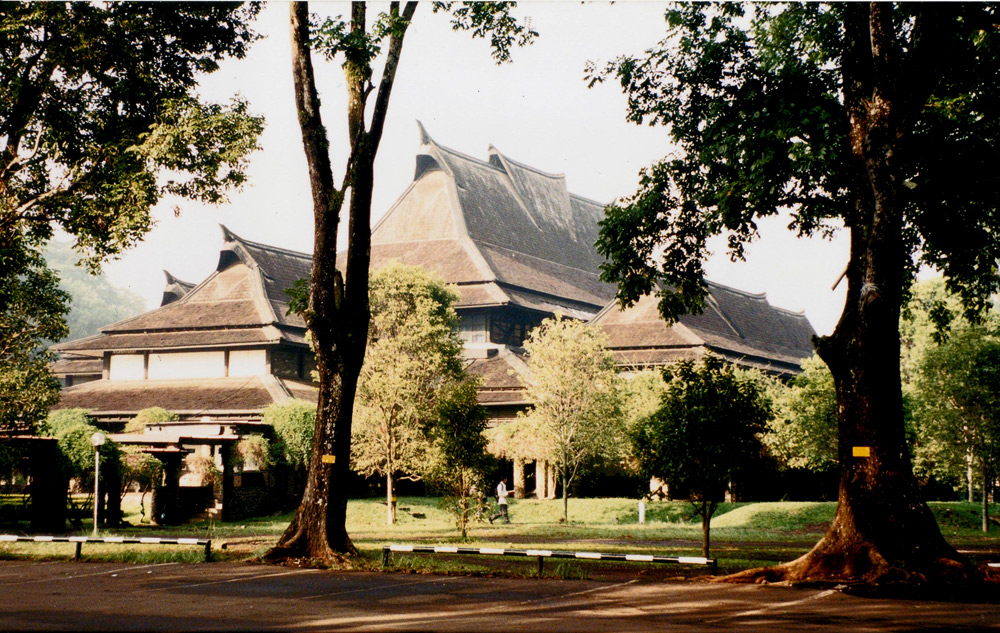
Bandung Institute of Technology (ITB) campus building

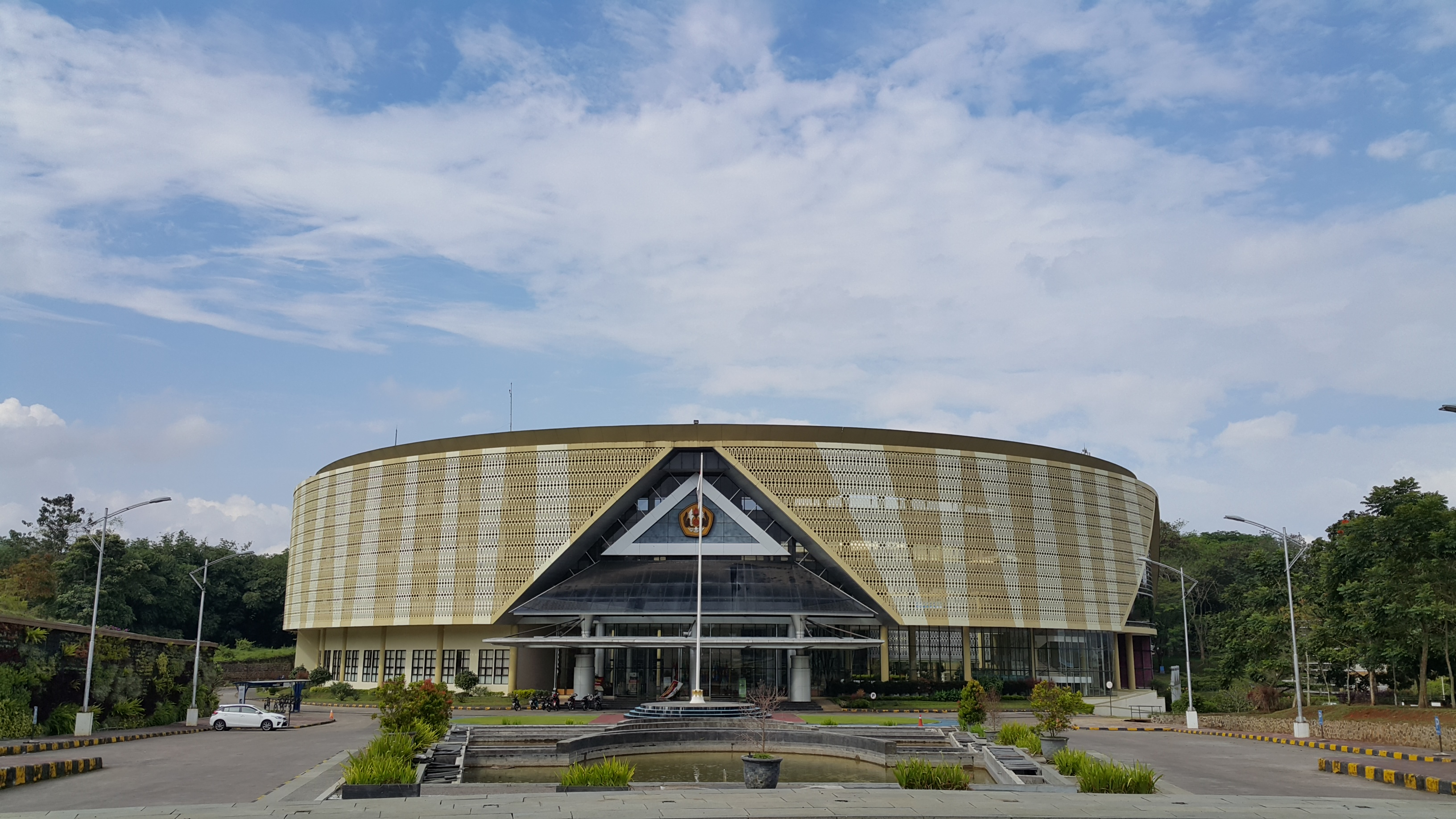
Padjadjaran University (UNPAD) rectorate building

Bandung has nearly 50 higher educational institutions and is among the most popular destinations for education in Indonesia. There are hundreds of public and private schools in the city and several state-funded and administered Junior High Schools (SMP Negeri), State High Schools (SMA Negeri) and State Vocational School (SMK). At least sixteen universities—three of which are state-owned—and 45 professional schools are scattered across the city. Education from social sciences and technology to tourism education can be found at one of these universities.

Among the universities located in Bandung include Bandung Institute of Technology (Institut Teknologi Bandung, ITB), Universitas Padjadjaran (Padjadjaran University), Telkom University (Universitas Telkom), National Institute of Technology (Indonesia) (Institut Teknologi Nasional), Parahyangan Catholic University, Universitas Islam Bandung (Bandung Islamic University), Universitas Kristen Maranatha (Maranatha Christian University), Universitas Islam Nusantara (Nusantara Islamic University), Universitas Pendidikan Indonesia (Indonesia University of Education), Universitas Islam Negeri Sunan Gunung Djati (Sunan Gunung Djati Islamic State University), Universitas Pasundan (Pasundan University), Politeknik Negeri Bandung (Bandung State Polytechnic), and Sekolah Tinggi Pariwisata Bandung (Bandung Institute of Tourism), Institut Seni Budaya Indonesia (Art and culture institute Indonesia) all being considered among the best universities in their respective fields of speciality in Indonesia. Established in 1920, ITB is Indonesia's oldest and most prestigious technical university. Universitas Pendidikan Indonesia (formerly IKIP Bandung, established in 1954) is one of the first institutions of higher education established after Indonesian independence and is currently a leading education university in the country. Universitas Padjadjaran (established in 1956) is considered to be one of the best universities in the country in the fields of medicine, law, communication, and economics.

International schools are also available in the city. They include the Bandung Alliance Intercultural School, Bandung Independent School, Bandung Japanese School (バンドン日本人学校), Bina Bangsa School Bandung, Bina Persada School, and Stamford School. In the north of Bandung, Bosscha Observatory is the only observatory in Indonesia. Construction of the observatory began in 1923 and was completed in 1928. In 1922, the first international publication from Bosscha Observatory was published, and in 1959, the observatory was absorbed as a part of the Department of Astronomy at the Bandung Institute of Technology.

== International relations ==
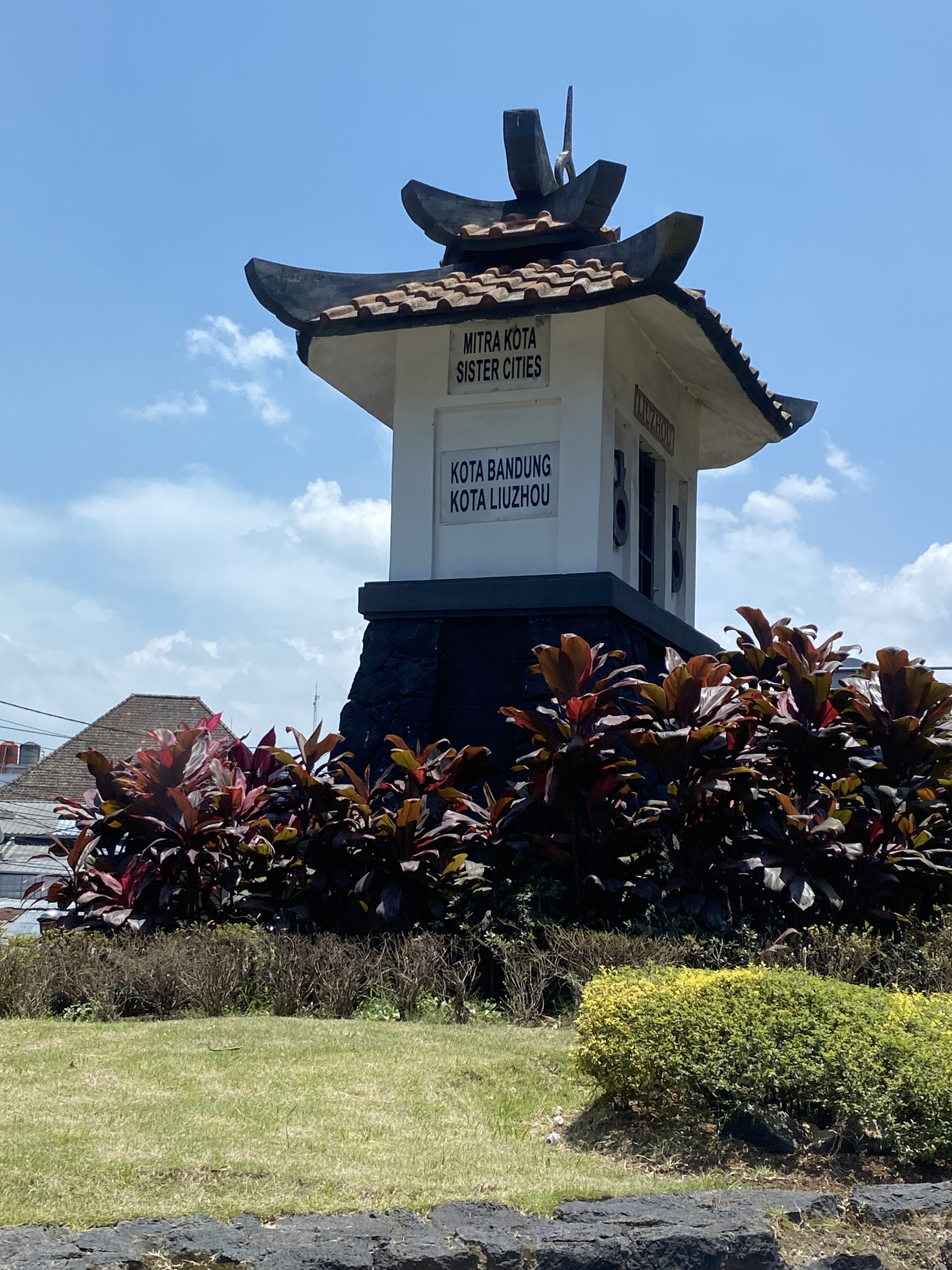
Monument to the sister-city relationship between Bandung and Liuzhou, China.

Several countries have set up their consulates in Bandung, including France, Netherlands, Poland, Latvia, Hungary, Austria, etc.

Bandung has sister relationships with a number of cities worldwide:

- Braunschweig, Germany
- Cotabato City, Philippines
- Cuenca, Ecuador
- Fort Worth, United States
- Kuching, Malaysia
- Liuzhou, China
- Melbourne, Australia
- Namur, Belgium
- Petaling Jaya, Malaysia
- Suwon, South Korea

== See also ==
- Colonial architecture of Bandung
- Greater Bandung
