= Punclut =

Recreational area

Coordinates: 6°51′30″S 107°36′46″E

Punclut or Puncak Ciumbuleuit Utara (Ciumbuleuit North Top) is a recreational area in Bandung, Indonesia located 7 kilometers from the city center. Tourists can see the city and adjoining areas from the top of Punclut. Many people play sports here and on Sunday there is a Sundanese culinary tour.
