= Pasupati Bridge =

Pasupati Bridge Jembatan Pasupati
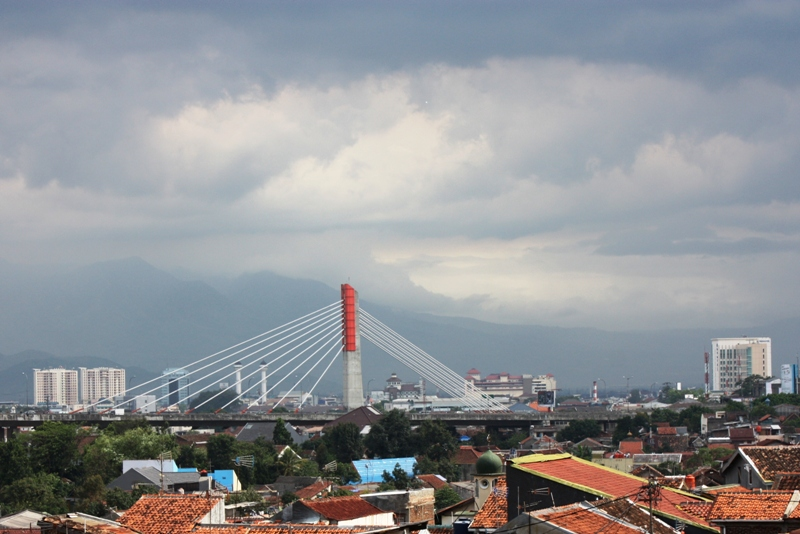
- The Pasupati Bridge on top of resident houses.
- Coordinates: 6°53′56″S 107°36′22″E
- Carries: Vehicles
- Crosses: Cikapundung Valley
- Locale: Bandung, Indonesia
- Other name(s): Pasupati Overpass

Characteristics
- Design: Cable-stayed bridge
- Total length: 2.8 kilometres (9,186 ft)
- Width: 30–60 metres (98–197 ft)

History
- Construction start: October 2001; 24 years ago
- Construction end: 25 June 2005; 20 years ago

Pasupati Bridge or Pasupati Overpass (Indonesian: Jembatan Pasupati, Sundanese: ᮏᮨᮙ᮪ᮘᮒᮔ᮪ ᮕᮞᮥᮕᮒᮤ) is a bridge that connects the north and east of Bandung through the Cikapundung valley. It has a length of 2.8 km and a width of 30–60 m. The road is built over Jalan Pasteur, which is a long street flanked by the palm trees that characterize the city of Bandung. The bridge and overpass are known for their colorful display, particularly at night, which has become emblematic of Bandung as a whole. The overpass and bridge connect to the main Cipularang Toll Road from Jakarta, and have greatly improved the traffic flow from the Greater Jakarta area into Bandung. Under the bridge, there is a park named Pasupati Park.

== History ==
The elevated highway structures in Bandung are given the name Pasupati. They formerly took the name Paspati, which may have been unfortunately misinterpreted as the Sundanese “pas mati” - "when death". Pasupati is a portmanteau of Jalan Pasteur and Jalan Surapati. The Pasupati structures have links back to the town planning work of Thomas Karsten. The current structure was built as a result of an infrastructure grant from Kuwait. After many years of delays and issues, initial trials were carried out on June 26, 2005.

== Structure ==
The Pasupati Bridge is the first in Indonesia that utilizes anti-earthquake technology. A Lock-Up Device (LUD), engineered in France, consists of 76 individual pieces. The bridge has 663 segments overall, supported by 46 poles. Each segment weighs from 80 tons up to 140 tons. The overpass structure includes a long cable-stayed bridge that crosses 161 meters above the Cikapundung valley with no intervening supports. The bridge over the Cikapundung is supported by 19 steel cables consisting of 10 wires on the western side and 9 cables on the eastern side. Each cable contains 91 small cables that each consists of seven smaller cables again. The ten western cables are paired.
