= Coat of arms of Bandung =

- Armiger: Bandung
- Adopted: 8 June 1953
- Shield: Or, a half hexagon Vert, a chief embattled of four Argent and Sable, Barry wavy of ten Argent and Azure
- Motto: Gemah Ripah Wibawa Mukti (Clean, Prosperous, Devout, Friendly)

The Coat of arms of Bandung is the official coat of arms of the city of Bandung. The emblem was adopted in June 1953.

== Description ==
The half hexagon represent Mount Tangkuban Perahu, The waves represent that Bandung used to be a large lake, on the ribbon is Bandung's official motto in the Sundanese: Gemah Ripah Wibawa Mukti which means (Clean, Prosperous, Devout, Friendly).

=== Dutch East Indies ===
Coat of arms of Bandoeng during Dutch colonial era, granted in 1931.

The first emblem of Bandung was officially granted on 11 August 1931. The arms consisted of a shield, divided diagonally by an embattled line, on the left side there are a wave of ten blue and white, and on the right side is yellow. The arms were supported by lions, above the arms was a mural crown, The motto in Latin says Ex Undis Sol (From the waves, the sun).
