= Cimerak, West Java =

Cimerak
- Location in West Java and Indonesia Cimerak (Indonesia)
- Coordinates: 7°44′32″S 108°25′27.8″E
- Country: Indonesia
- Province: West Java
- Regency: Pangandaran Regency
- District: Cimerak District
- Elevation: 364 ft (111 m)

Population (2010)
  - Total: 43,500
- Time zone: UTC+7 (Indonesia Western Standard Time)

Cimerak is a district and town in Pangandaran Regency in West Java province, Indonesia. Its population is 43,500 according to the 2010 census.

== Climate ==
Cimerak has a tropical rainforest climate (Af) with heavy to very heavy rainfall year-round.

Climate data for Cimerak
Month	Jan	Feb	Mar	Apr	May	Jun	Jul	Aug	Sep	Oct	Nov	Dec	Year
Mean daily maximum °C (°F)	30.5 (86.9)	30.9 (87.6)	30.8 (87.4)	30.8 (87.4)	30.6 (87.1)	29.8 (85.6)	28.7 (83.7)	28.8 (83.8)	29.2 (84.6)	30.0 (86.0)	30.1 (86.2)	30.4 (86.7)	30.1 (86.1)
Daily mean °C (°F)	26.7 (80.1)	26.9 (80.4)	26.8 (80.2)	26.9 (80.4)	26.7 (80.1)	25.9 (78.6)	25.2 (77.4)	25.0 (77.0)	25.4 (77.7)	26.2 (79.2)	26.5 (79.7)	26.7 (80.1)	26.2 (79.2)
Mean daily minimum °C (°F)	23.0 (73.4)	22.9 (73.2)	22.9 (73.2)	23.1 (73.6)	22.9 (73.2)	22.0 (71.6)	21.7 (71.1)	21.3 (70.3)	21.7 (71.1)	22.5 (72.5)	23.0 (73.4)	23.1 (73.6)	22.5 (72.5)
Average rainfall mm (inches)	213 (8.4)	204 (8.0)	251 (9.9)	289 (11.4)	343 (13.5)	341 (13.4)	448 (17.6)	310 (12.2)	323 (12.7)	487 (19.2)	494 (19.4)	306 (12.0)	4,009 (157.7)
Source: Climate-Data.org
