= Parigi, West Java =

Parigi
- District

Regional transcription(s)
  - Sundanese: ᮕᮛᮤᮌᮤ
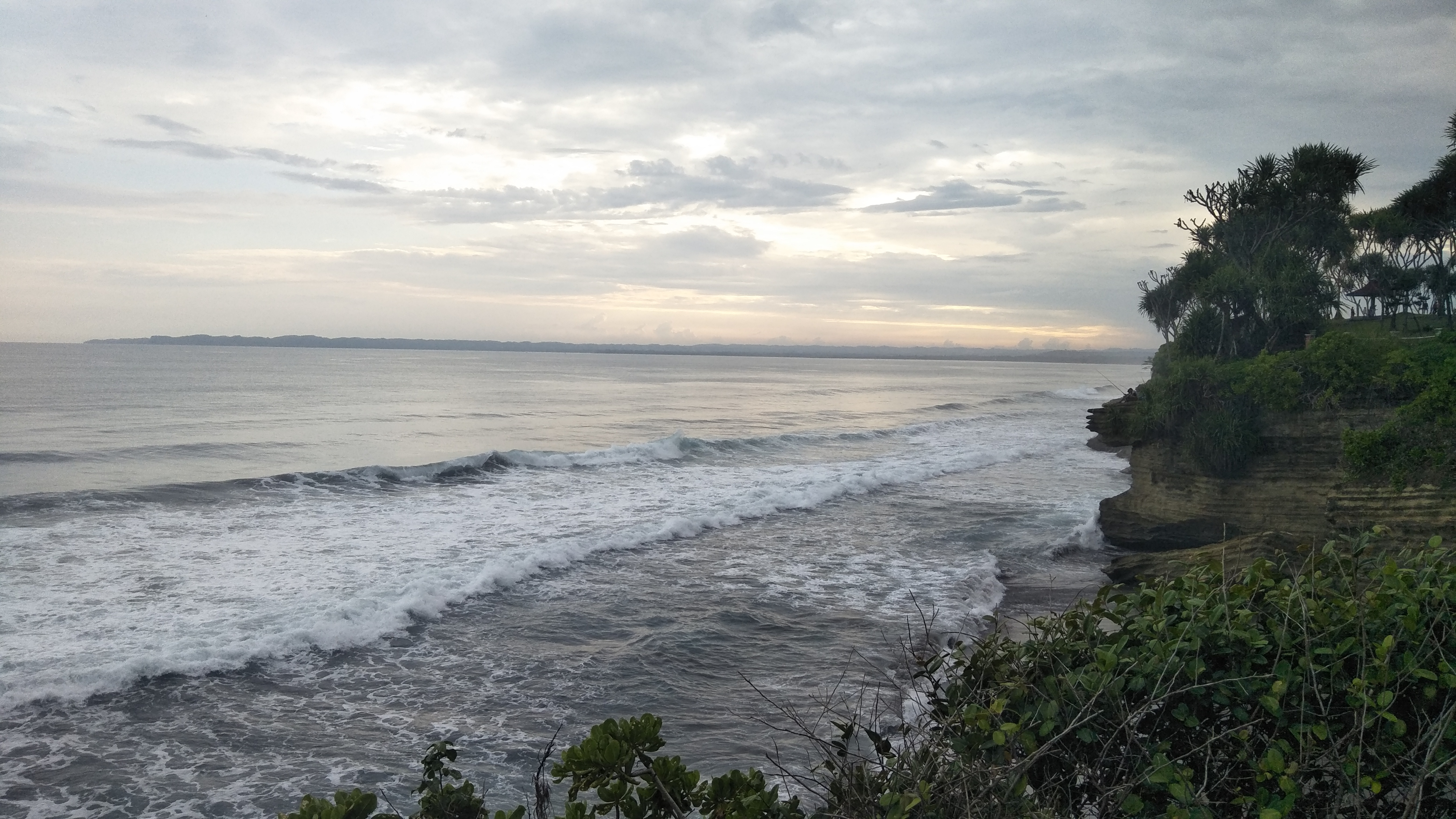
- Batu Hiu Beach during sunset

- Location in Java and Indonesia Parigi (Indonesia)
- Coordinates: 7°41′29″S 108°32′14″E
- Country: Indonesia
- Province: West Java
- Regency: Pangandaran Regency

Government
  - Camat: Edih Saprudin
  - Secretary: Lili Suherli

Area
  - Total: 100.14 km^{2} (38.66 sq mi)
- Elevation: 48 m (157 ft)

Population (2020)
  - Total: 44,857
  - Density: 447.94/km^{2} (1,160.2/sq mi)
- Time zone: UTC+7 (IWT)
- Postal code: 46393
- Area code: (+62) 265
- Villages: 10
- Website: Official website

Parigi (Sundanese: ᮕᮛᮤᮌᮤ) is a coastal district (kecamatan) of Pangandaran Regency, in West Java Province of Indonesia. The district is the administration seat of the regency. Parigi borders the Indian Ocean to the south.

== Administrative divisions ==
Parigi is divided into 10 villages (desa) which are as follows:

- Bojong
- Cibenda
- Ciliang
- Cintakarya
- Cintaratu
- Karangbenda
- Karangjaladri
- Parakanmanggu
- Parigi
- Selasari

== Tourism ==
Parigi is renowned for its Batu Hiu Beach (Shark's Rock Beach).

== Climate ==
Parigi has a tropical rainforest climate (Af) with heavy to very heavy rainfall year-round.

Climate data for Parigi
| Month | Jan | Feb | Mar | Apr | May | Jun | Jul | Aug | Sep | Oct | Nov | Dec | Year |
|---|---|---|---|---|---|---|---|---|---|---|---|---|---|
| Mean daily maximum °C (°F) | 31.0 (87.8) | 31.4 (88.5) | 31.4 (88.5) | 31.3 (88.3) | 31.1 (88.0) | 30.4 (86.7) | 29.3 (84.7) | 29.3 (84.7) | 29.8 (85.6) | 30.7 (87.3) | 30.8 (87.4) | 30.9 (87.6) | 30.6 (87.1) |
| Daily mean °C (°F) | 27.2 (81.0) | 27.4 (81.3) | 27.4 (81.3) | 27.4 (81.3) | 27.2 (81.0) | 26.4 (79.5) | 25.7 (78.3) | 25.5 (77.9) | 26.0 (78.8) | 26.9 (80.4) | 27.2 (81.0) | 27.2 (81.0) | 26.8 (80.2) |
| Mean daily minimum °C (°F) | 23.5 (74.3) | 23.4 (74.1) | 23.5 (74.3) | 23.6 (74.5) | 23.4 (74.1) | 22.5 (72.5) | 22.2 (72.0) | 21.8 (71.2) | 22.3 (72.1) | 23.1 (73.6) | 23.6 (74.5) | 23.6 (74.5) | 23.0 (73.5) |
| Average rainfall mm (inches) | 237 (9.3) | 225 (8.9) | 262 (10.3) | 288 (11.3) | 334 (13.1) | 305 (12.0) | 339 (13.3) | 259 (10.2) | 263 (10.4) | 441 (17.4) | 435 (17.1) | 297 (11.7) | 3,685 (145) |
Source: Climate-Data.org
