= Cukang Taneuh =

Canyon in West Java, Indonesia

Cukang Taneuh Green Canyon
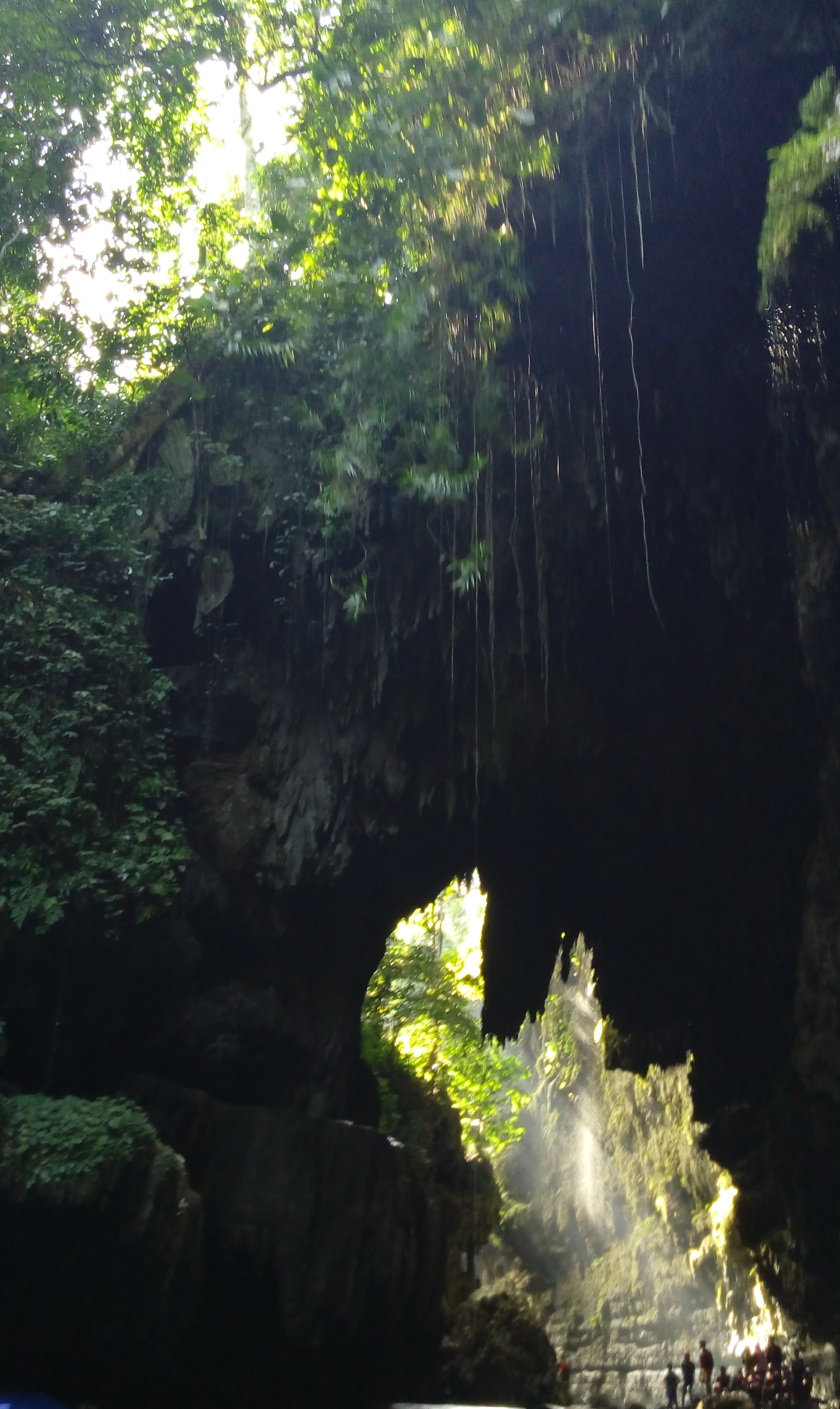
- Cukang Taneuh

Geography
- Location: Kertayasa Village, Cijulang Town, Pangandaran Regency, West Java, Indonesia
- Coordinates: 7°44′07″S 108°27′23″E
- Rivers: Cijulang River
- Interactive map of Cukang Taneuh; Green Canyon

Cukang Taneuh, which means Soil Bridge in Sundanese, is a canyon located in Pangandaran, West Java, Indonesia. It is also known as Green Canyon. The name may have been derived from the color of the surrounding water and hills.

The canyon was formed over millions of years by the Cijulang River, which is flanked by two rocky cliffs with trees above it.

The entrance to the canyon is shaped like a cave, which opens up revealing a river between two cliffs. There is a small waterfall at this entrance called Palatar. Many more waterfalls can be seen along these cliffs.
