= Pangandaran Regency =

Regency in West Java, Indonesia

Pangandaran Regency Kabupaten Pangandaran
- Regency

Regional transcription(s)
  - Sundanese: ᮊᮘᮥᮕᮒᮦᮔ᮪ ᮕᮍᮔ᮪ᮓᮛᮔ᮪
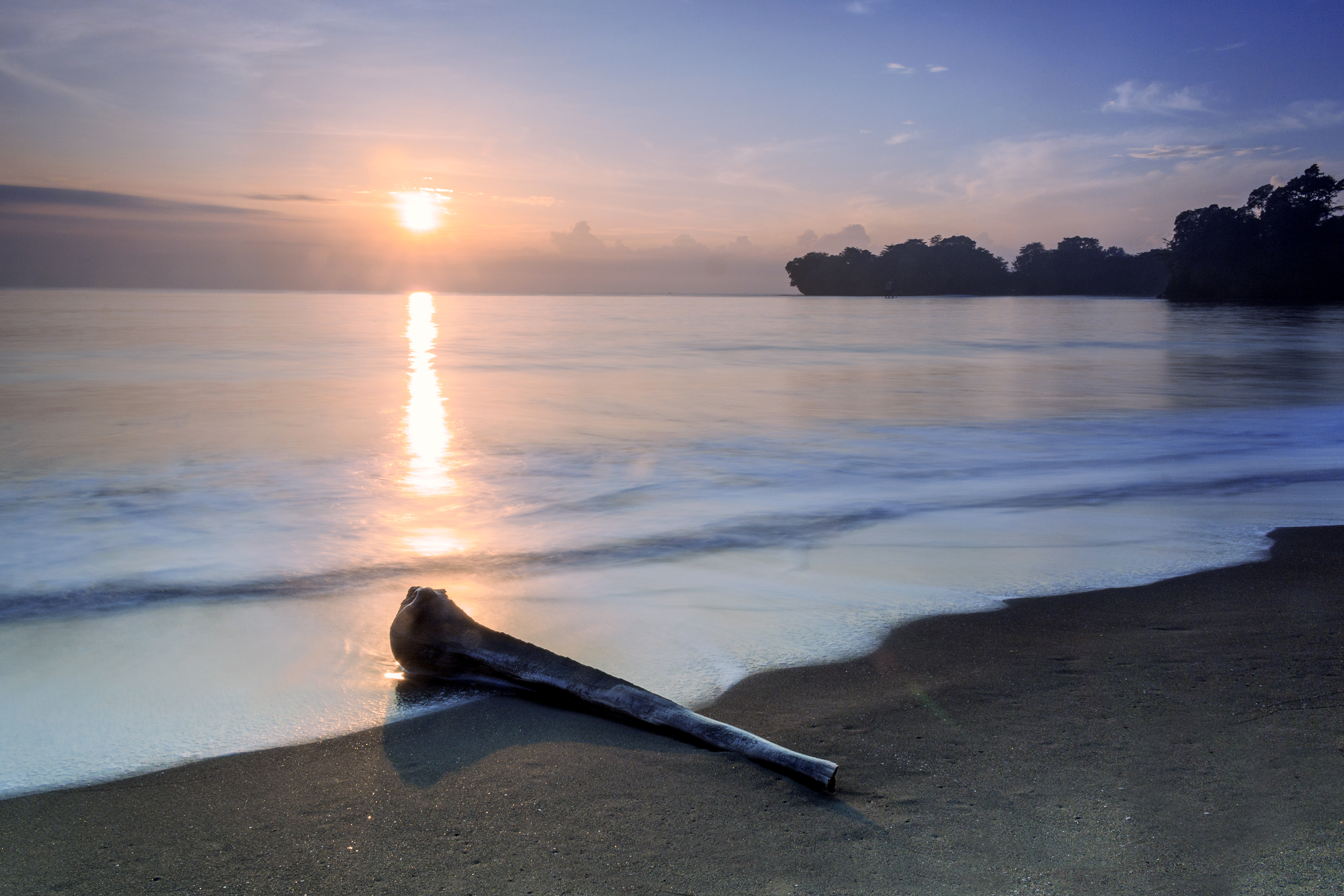
- Batu Karas beach

- Coat of arms
- Motto: Jaya Karsa Makarya Praja ᮏᮚ ᮊᮁᮞ ᮙᮊᮁᮚ ᮕᮢᮏ
- Location within West Java

- Location in Java and Indonesia Pangandaran Regency (Indonesia)
- Coordinates: 7°42′06″S 108°29′41″E
- Country: Indonesia
- Province: West Java

Government
  - Regent: Citra Pitriyami
  - Vice Regent: Ino Darsono

Area
  - Total: 1,010.92 km^{2} (390.32 sq mi)

Population (mid 2025 estimate)
  - Total: 436,494
  - Density: 431.779/km^{2} (1,118.30/sq mi)
- Time zone: UTC+7 (WIB)
- Website: pangandarankab.go.id

Pangandaran Regency is a Regency in West Java province, Indonesia, formed on 25 October 2012 out of the former southern portion of Ciamis Regency. The population of this area as of the 2010 Census was 383,848, and was 423,670 at the 2020 Census; the official estimate as of mid 2025 was 436,494 (comprising 217,904 males and 218,590 females). The administrative capital is the town of Parigi.

Pangandaran Regency contains a beach called Pantai Pangandaran (Pangandaran Beach) and Cukang Taneuh Canyon (Green Canyon).

== Etymology ==
The name "Pangandaran" has three meanings: andar, andar-andar, and pangan + daharan. Andar-andar, in Sundanese, means "traveler" or "newcomer." This is because the area was once a place explored by Sundanese fishermen. Furthermore, pangan + daharan means "place to earn a living," as they earned their living by fishing.

== Administration ==
The regency is divided into ten districts (kecamatan), tabulated below with their areas and their populations at the 2010 Census and 2020 Census, together with the official estimates for mid 2025. The administrative centre of each district is in the town of the same name. The table also includes the numbers of administrative villages (all classed as rural desa) in each district, and its postcode(s).

Kode Wilayah	Name of District (kecamatan)	Area in km^{2}	Pop'n Census 2010	Pop'n Census 2020	Pop'n Estimate mid 2025	No. of villages	Post code
32.18.03	Cimerak	187.78	43,500	49,190	51,265	11	46395
32.18.02	Cijulang	93.42	26,278	27,750	27,979	7	46394
32.18.04	Cigugur	105.66	20,915	22,800	23,341	7	46392
32.18.05	Langkaplancar	183.17	46,756	50,990	52,225	15	46391
32.18.01	Parigi	100.15	41,967	46,230	47,579	10	46393
32.18.10	Sidamulih	90.02	26,694	29,810	30,888	7	46365
32.18.09	Pangandaran	82.65	52,163	58,300	60,422	8	46396
32.18.08	Kalipucang	107.42	35,432	38,290	39,036	9	46397
32.18.07	Padaherang	118.72	61,366	68,120	70,374	14	46384 ^{(a)}
32.18.06	Mangunjaya	30.11	28,777	32,200	33,385	5	46371
	Totals	1,010.92	383,848	423,670	436,494	93	

Note: (a) except the villages of Ciganjeng (with a postcode of 46372) and Sukanagara (with a postcode of 46267).

== Tourism ==
In 2011 Ciamis Regency was boosting the (new) tourist destinations with the idea of making a new Regency on the south of the '(virtual) isthmus' where there is also a tourist destination (Pangandaran Beach) as a cash cow. The tourist destinations are Situ Lengkong Panjalu, Kingdom of Sunda Astana Gede Kawali site and the most potential destination is Curug Tujuh, Cibolang, Panjalu. Curug Tujuh is located 2 kilometres from Cibolang main road. Curug Tujuh means "seven waterfalls", due to there being 7 waterfalls along a 5 kilometres track. The tallest waterfall is more than one hundred metres high.

Situ Lengkong Panjalu, 76.2 hectares has a small island in the centre of the lake called Nusa Gede where many East Javanese people come to visit King of Panjalu's son's cemetery.

In June 2011 the Tourism and Culture Ministry agreed to make the Pangandaran area into a National Tourism Site like Bali. It covers Karapyak Beach in Kalipucang District through Pangandaran Beach in Pangandaran District and Batu Karas Beach in Cijulang District.

In 2010, Green Canyon was visited by 125,000 visitors, and in 2011 by 150,000 visitors. On holiday there were more than 2,000 visitors per day increased boat waiting time due to narrow access to Green Canyon and the boat had to wait for those who swam.

Several artistic and tourist attractions attract visitors.
