= Tarawangsa =

Indonesian traditional musical instrument

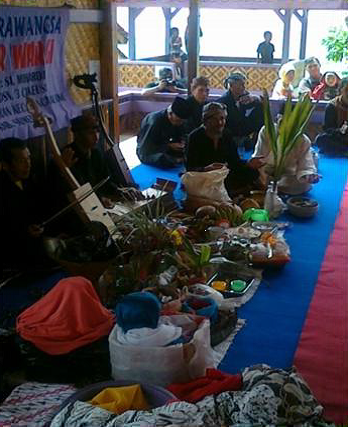
- A Tarawangsa ensemble in the Ngalaksa ceremony in West Java, Indonesia.
- Classification: Chordophones
- Developed: West Java and Banten, Indonesia

Playing range
- Pelog scales

Tarawangsa is a traditional Sundanese musical instrument from West Java, Indonesia, in the form of a stringed instrument that has two strings made of steel or iron wire. Tarawangsa is an ensemble of chordophones (stringed instruments whose sound source is a resonator room) of two musical instruments. One is called tarawangsa itself, played by swiping and the other is called jentreng played by picking. The art of Tarawangsa is performed in the Ngalaksa ceremony, which is a ceremony for abundant harvests. The ceremony in the traditional agrarian society of the Sundanese is always identified with the figure of Nyai Sri Pohaci or Nyi Pohaci Sanghyang Dangdayang Asri or Dewi Asri or Dewi Sri as the Sundanese goddess of rice.

In 2011, the tarawangsa musical instrument of the Sundanese people from West Java was recognized as National Intangible Cultural Heritage of Indonesia by the Indonesian Ministry of Education and Culture.

== Etymology ==
The word 'tarawangsa' comes from the Sundanese language. Tarawangsa comes from three combinations of words, namely 'Ta - Ra - Wangsa'. 'Ta' is an acronym for the word 'Meta' which means 'movement', then 'Ra' means 'great fire' or 'the sun', and 'Wangsa' is a synonym for the word 'nation'. So 'Ta-Ra-Wangsa' means 'the story of the life of the sun nation'. In other words, Tarawangsa is an art of welcoming the harvest of rice plants that are very dependent on the sun as a symbol of gratitude to God Almighty.

== History ==
The word tarawangsa is found in ancient Balinese manuscripts of the 10th century. In the manuscripts written the words "trewasa" and "trewangsah". According to Jaap Kunst in his book 'Hindu-Javanese Musical Instruments (1968)', it was stated that at that time the art of tarawangsa had existed in Javanese, Balinese, and Sundanese communities. But at this time only remaining in the area of Sundanese of West Java and Banten. In the ancient Sundanese book, Sewaka Darma (16th century), the term tarawangsa is also found which states that tarawangsa is a musical instrument. During the British colonial period (1811 – 1816) in Indonesia, Thomas Stamford Raffles wrote the book The History of Java in which he discussed batik, angklung, and tarawangsa.

== Gallery ==
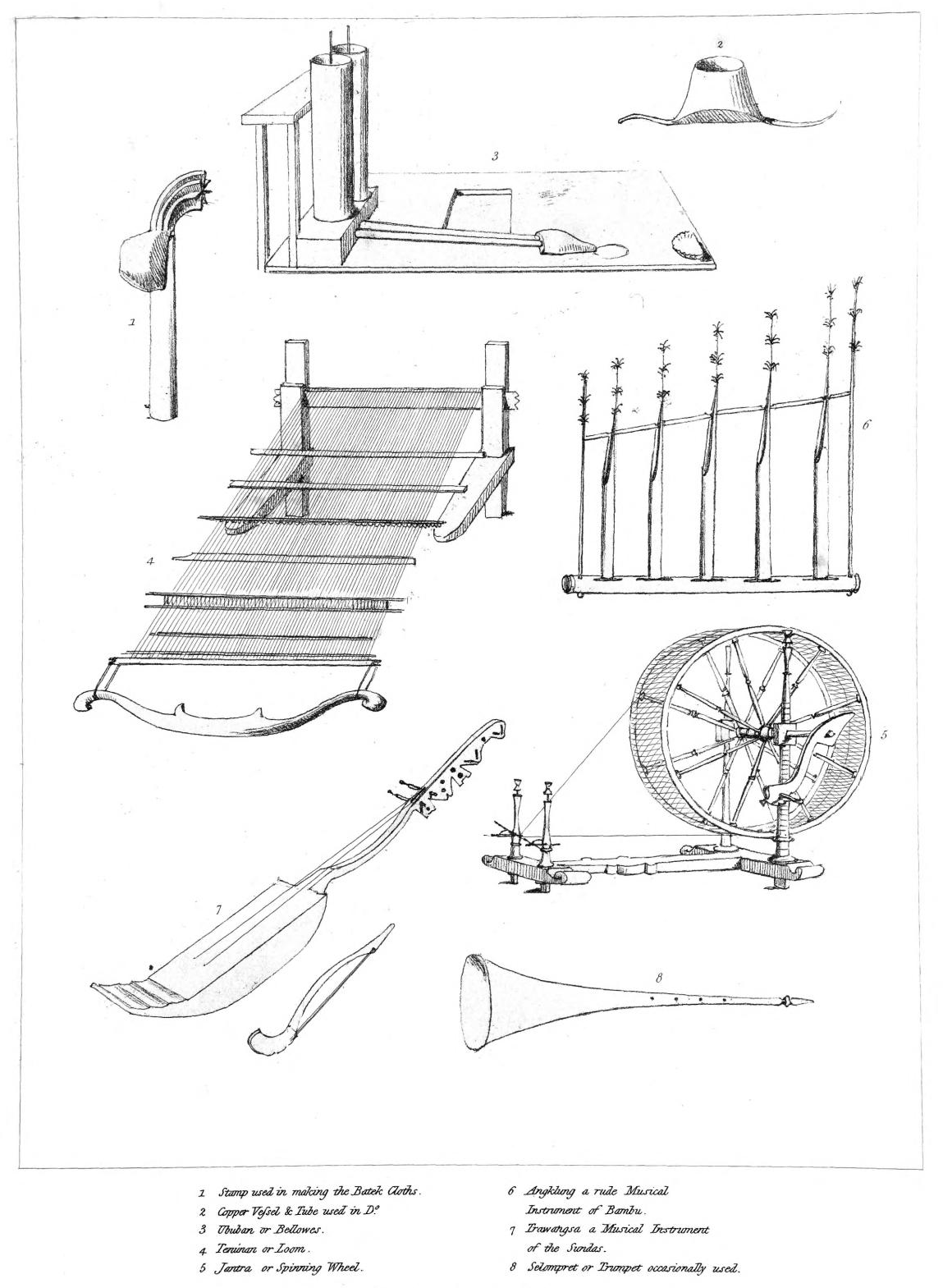
Picture of Tarawangsa musical instrument in the book of The History of Java by Thomas Stamford Raffles (1817).
