= West Java =

Province in Java, Indonesia

West Java Jawa Barat
- Province
- Province of West Java; Provinsi Jawa Barat
- Coat of arms
- Nickname: Tatar Sunda (Sundanese) ᮒᮒᮁ ᮞᮥᮔ᮪ᮓ "Land of the Sundanese"
- Motto: Gemah, Ripah, Répéh, Rapih (Sundanese) ᮌᮨᮙᮂ ᮛᮤᮕᮂ ᮛᮦᮕᮦᮂ ᮛᮕᮤᮂ "Prosperous, Peaceful, Convenient, and Harmonious"
- West Java in Indonesia
- Interactive map of West Java
- Coordinates: 6°45′S 107°30′E
- Country: Indonesia
- Region: Java (Western Indonesia)
- Established: 14 July 1950
- Capital: Bandung
- Largest city: Bekasi

Government
  - Body: West Java Provincial Government
  - Governor: Dedi Mulyadi (Gerindra)
  - Vice Governor: Erwan Setiawan
  - Legislature: West Java Regional House of Representatives (DPRD)

Area
  - Total: 37,053.33 km^{2} (14,306.37 sq mi)
  - Rank: 21st in Indonesia
- Highest elevation (Mount Ciremai): 3,078 m (10,098 ft)

Population (mid 2025 estimate)
  - Total: 50,759,003
  - Density: 1,369.890/km^{2} (3,548.000/sq mi)

Demographics
  - Ethnic groups (2010): 71.87% Sundanese; 16.35% Javanese; 5.33% Betawi; 6.45% others
  - Religion (2024): 97.22% Islam: 2.45% Christianity; 1.83% Protestantism; 0.65% Catholicism; 0.22% Buddhism; 0.04% Hinduism; 0.04% others (including Confucianism, Sunda Wiwitan, etc.)
  - Languages and dialects: Indonesian (official); Sundanese (native); Javanese; Betawi
- Time zone: UTC+7 (Indonesia Western Time)
- ISO 3166 code: ID-JB
- GDP (nominal): 2022
- Total: Rp 2,422.8 trillion (3rd); US$ 163.2 billion Int$ 509.1 billion (PPP)
- Per capita: Rp 49.0 million (23rd); US$ 3,302; Int$ 10,305 (PPP)
- Growth: ▲5.45%
- HDI (2024): ▲0.749 (15th) – high
- Website: jabarprov.go.id

West Java (Indonesian: Jawa Barat, Sundanese: ᮏᮝ ᮊᮥᮜᮧᮔ᮪, romanized: Jawa Kulon) is an Indonesian province on the western part of the island of Java, with its provincial capital in Bandung and its largest city is Bekasi. West Java is bordered by the province of Banten and the country's capital region of Jakarta to the west, the Java Sea to the north, the province of Central Java to the east and the Indian Ocean to the south. With Banten, this province is the native homeland of the Sundanese people, the second-largest ethnic group in Indonesia.

West Java was one of the first eight provinces of Indonesia formed following the country's independence proclamation and was later legally re-established on 14 July 1950. With effect from 28 August 1961, the city of Jakarta was split off from West Java as a 'special capital region' (Daerah Khusus Ibukota), with a status equivalent to that of a province, while in October 2000 the western parts of the province were in turn split away to form a separate Banten province.

Even following these split-offs, West Java is by far the most populous province of Indonesia with a population of 48,274,162 as of the 2020 Census, which grew to 50,759,003 at mid 2025 according to the official estimates; the population continues to grew at about 400,000 per year, having surpassed the 50 millions milestone during late 2023. The province's largest cities, Bekasi (a satellite city within the Jakarta metropolitan area), Bandung and Depok (the latter also within the Jakarta metropolitan area), are the third, fourth and sixth most populous cities in Indonesia respectively. Bandung is also one of the most densely populated cities proper in the world.

== History ==
=== Prehistory ===
The oldest human inhabitant archaeological findings in the region were unearthed in Anyer on the western coast of Java with evidence of bronze and iron metallurgical culture dating to the first millennium AD. The prehistoric Buni culture, near present-day Bekasi, developed clay pottery with evidence found in Anyer to Cirebon. Artifacts dated 400 BC — AD 100, such as food and drink containers, were found mostly as burial gifts. There is archaeological evidence in Batujaya Archaeological Site dating from the 2nd century and, according to Dr Tony Djubiantono, the head of Bandung Archaeology Agency, Jiwa Temple in Batujaya, Karawang, was also built around this time.

=== Hindu-Buddhist and Islamic era ===
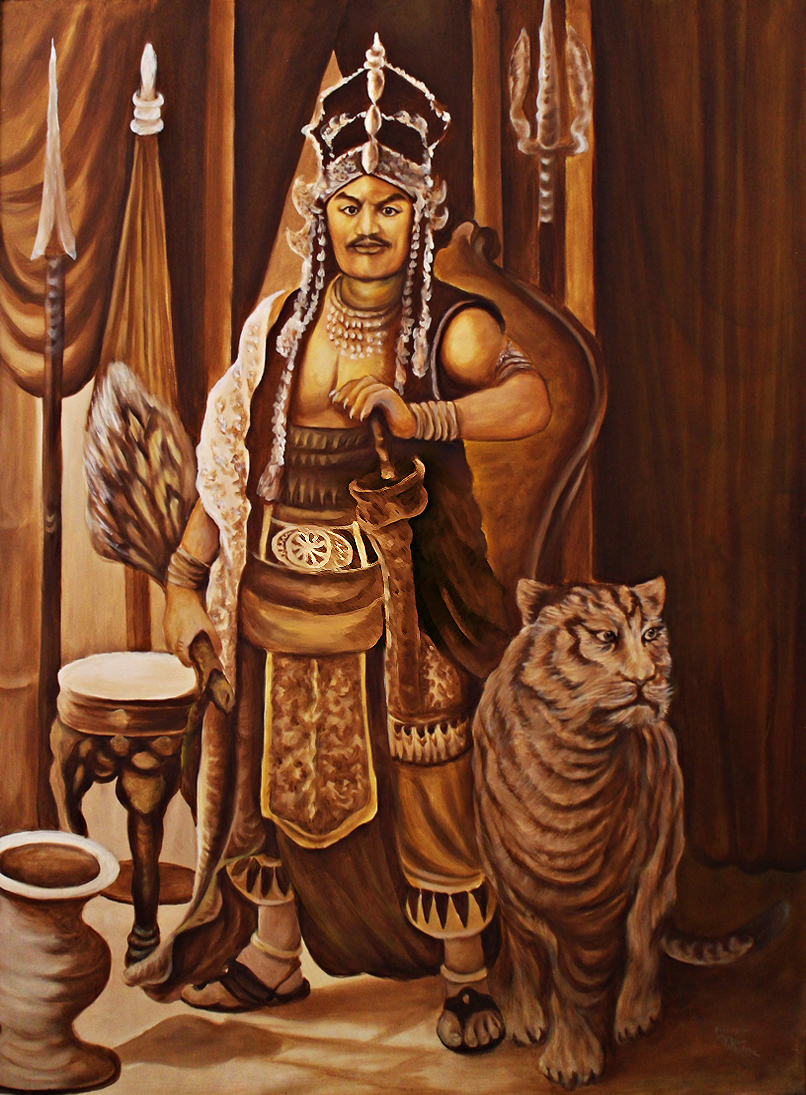
Sri Baduga Maharaja is a Maharaja (King) who was very influential during the Sunda Kingdom.

One of the earliest known recorded histories in Indonesia is from the former Tarumanagara kingdom, where seven, fourth-century stones are inscribed in Wengi letters (used in the Pallava period) and in Sanskrit describing the kings of the kingdom of Tarumanagara. Records of Tarumanegara lasted until the sixth century, which coincides with the attack of Srivijaya, as stated in the Kota Kapur inscription (AD 686).

The Sunda Kingdom subsequently became the ruling power of the region, as recorded on the Kebon Kopi II inscription (AD 932). The Sunda Kingdom reached its peak during the reign of King Sri Baduga Maharaja, whose reign from 1482 to 1521 is traditionally remembered as an age of peace and prosperity among Sundanese people.

An Ulama, Sunan Gunung Jati, settled in Cirebon, intending to spread Islam in the town. Meanwhile, the Sultanate of Demak in Central Java grew to become a threat to the Sunda kingdom. To defend against the threat, Prabu Surawisesa Jayaperkosa signed the Luso-Sundanese Treaty with the Portuguese in 1512. In return, the Portuguese were granted access to build fortresses and warehouses in the area, as well as forming trading agreements with the kingdom. This first international treaty of Sunda Kingdom with the Europeans was commemorated by the placement of the Padrao stone monument at the bank of the Ciliwung River in 1522.

Although the treaty with the Portuguese had been established, it could not come to realisation. Sunda Kalapa harbour fell under the alliance of the Sultanates of Demak and Cirebon (former vassal state of Sunda kingdom) in 1524 after forces under Paletehan alias Fadillah Khan had conquered the city. In 1524–1525, troops under Sunan Gunung Jati also seized the port of Banten and established the Sultanate of Banten which was affiliated to the Demak Sultanate. The war between the Sunda kingdom and the Demak and Cirebon sultanates continued for five years until a peace treaty was made in 1531 between King Surawisesa and Sunan Gunung Jati. From 1567 to 1579, under the last king Raja Mulya, alias Prabu Surya Kencana, the Sunda kingdom declined, under pressure from Sultanate of Banten. After 1576, the kingdom could not maintain control over its capital at Pakuan Pajajaran (present-day Bogor), and gradually the Sultanate of Banten took over the former Sunda kingdom's territory. The Mataram Sultanate from Central Java also seized the Priangan region, the southeastern part of the kingdom.

=== European colonization and Contemporary era ===
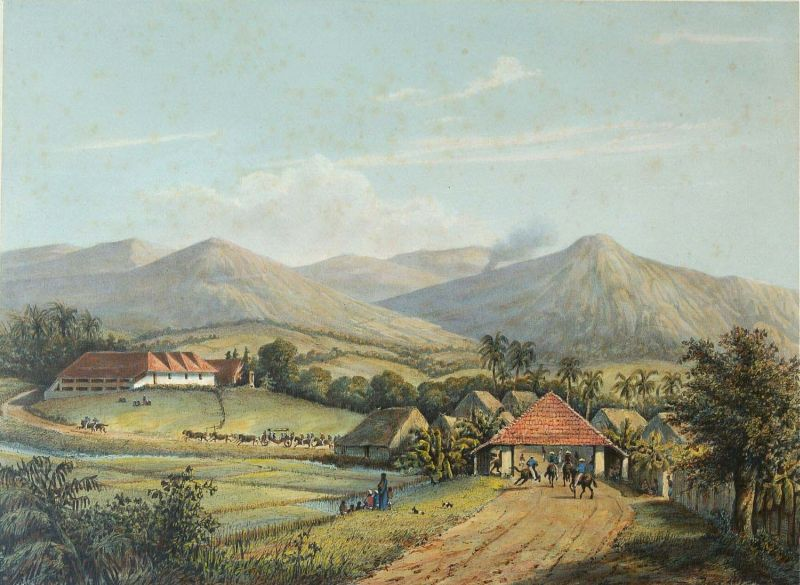
Parahyangan highland near Buitenzorg (present day Bogor), c. 1865–1872

In the 16th century, Dutch and British trading companies established trading ships in western Java after the fall of the Sultanate of Banten. For the next three hundred years, western Java fell under the Dutch East Indies' administration. West Java was officially declared as a province of Indonesia in 1950, referring to a statement from Staatblad number 378. On 17 October 2000, as part of nationwide political decentralization, Banten was separated from West Java and made into a new province. There have been recent proposals to rename the province Pasundan ("Sundanese community") after the historical name for West Java.

== Government and administrative divisions ==
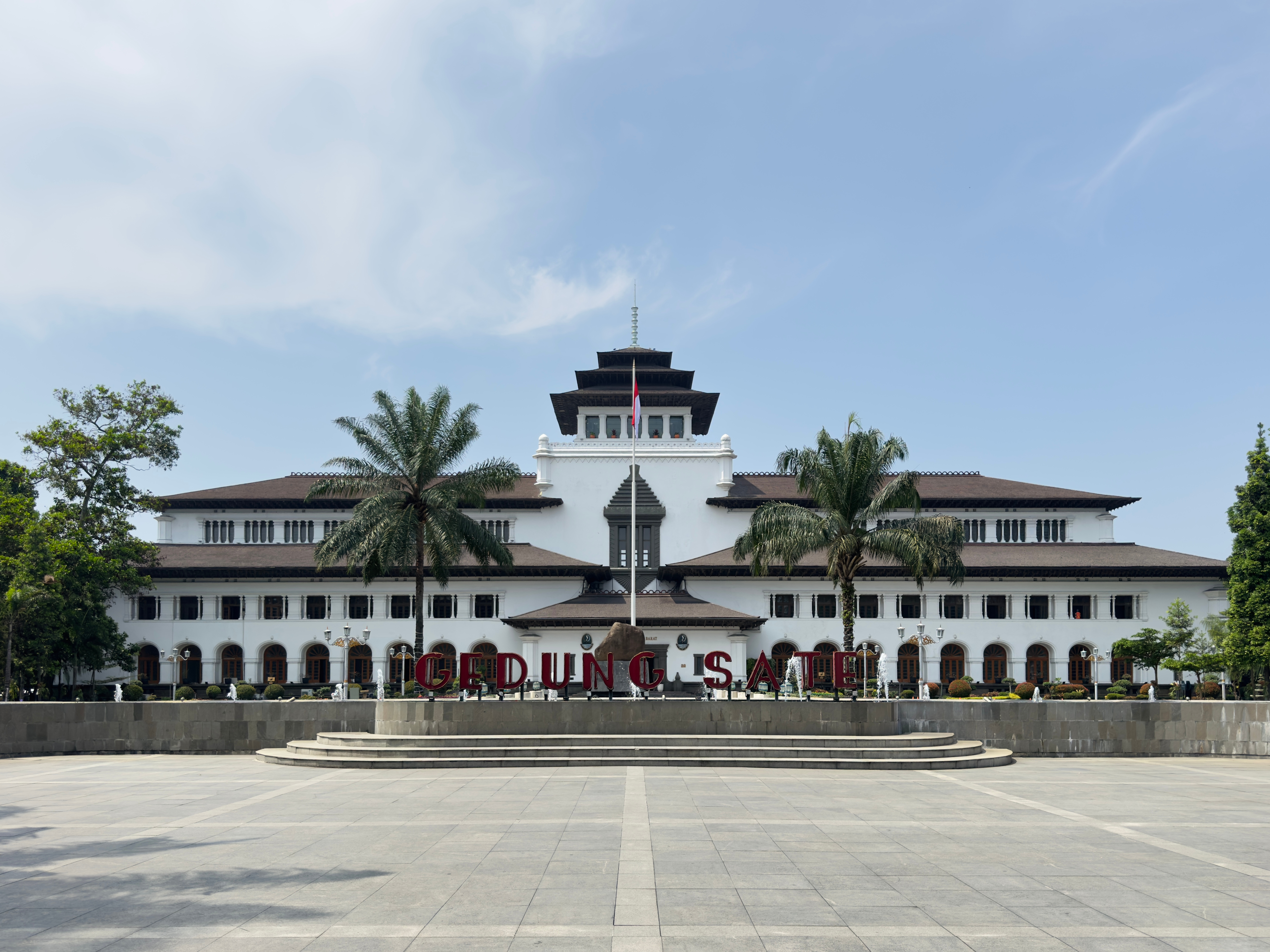
Gedung Sate is the Governor's office of West Java

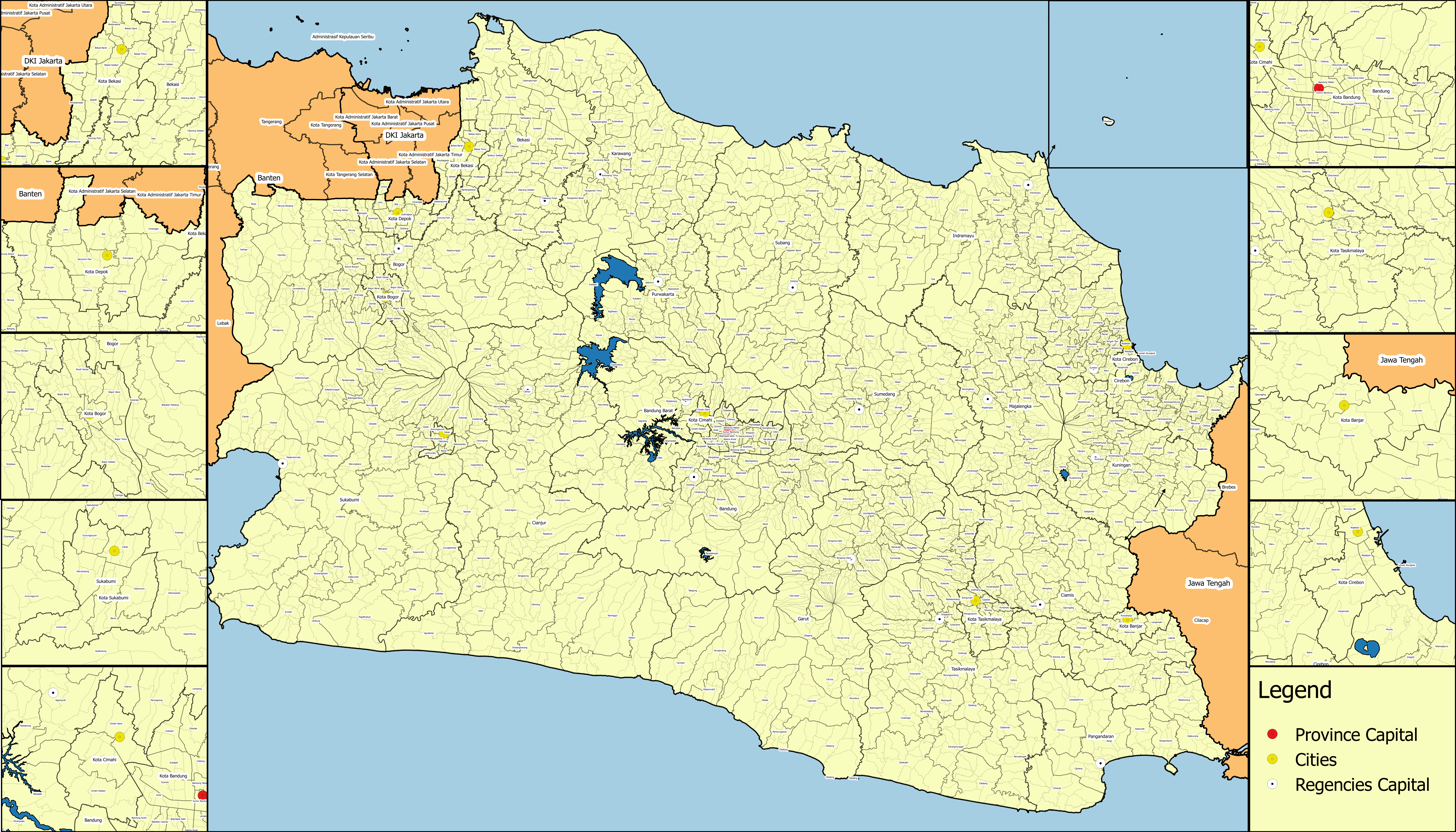
2nd-level Administrative map of West Java Province

The province is governed by Governor (Dedi Mulyadi of the Gerindra Party) and Vice Governor (Erwan Setiawan) and a Regional House of Representatives (DPRD) comprising 120 elected members (95 males and 25 females). In the northwest, Bogor Regency is represented by 11 members, Bogor City by 3 members, Bekasi Regency by 7 members, and Bekasi and Depok Cities by 11 members. Elections were held on 14 February 2024 (concurrent with presidential and parliamentary elections), following which the two political parties with the most representatives were Golkar and Gerindra, with each represented by 20 members; other parties were PKS with 19 members, PDI Perjuangan with 17 members, PKB with 15 members, Demokrat and NasDem each with 8 members, PAN with 7 members and PPP with 6 members.

From the creation of West Java Province, the province of West Java was subdivided into four cities (Kota) and twenty regencies (Kabupaten), excluding the zone separated off in 1950 to form the Special Capital Area of Jakarta. Subsequently four of the regencies which were separated off in 2000 to form the new Banten Province and five new independent cities were created between 1996 and 2002 by separation from their surrounding regencies - Bekasi on 16 December 1996, Depok on 27 April 1999, Cimahi and Tasikmalaya on 21 June 2001, and Banjar on 11 December 2002. A 17th regency was formed on 2 January 2007 – West Bandung Regency – from the western half of Bandung Regency, and an 18th regency was formed in October 2012 – Pangandaran Regency – from the southern half of Ciamis Regency. On 25 October 2013, the People's Representative Council (DPR) began reviewing draft laws on the establishment of 57 prospective new regencies (and eight new provinces), including a further three regencies in West Java – South Garut (Garut Selatan), North Sukabumi (Sukabumi Utara) and West Bogor (Bogor Barat) – but no action has followed in view of the moratorium adopted since 2013 by the Indonesian government on the creation of new provinces, regencies and cities, so none of these three prospective regencies are shown separately on the map below, nor in the following table.

These 9 cities and 18 regencies are listed below with their areas and their populations at the 2010 Census and 2020 Census, together with official estimates as at mid 2025. They are divided into 627 districts (Kecamatan) as at 2025, which comprise 663 urban villages (Kelurahan) and 5,294 rural villages (Desa). The table also includes the average population density as at mid 2025 for each regency or city.).

Cities and Regencies of West Java
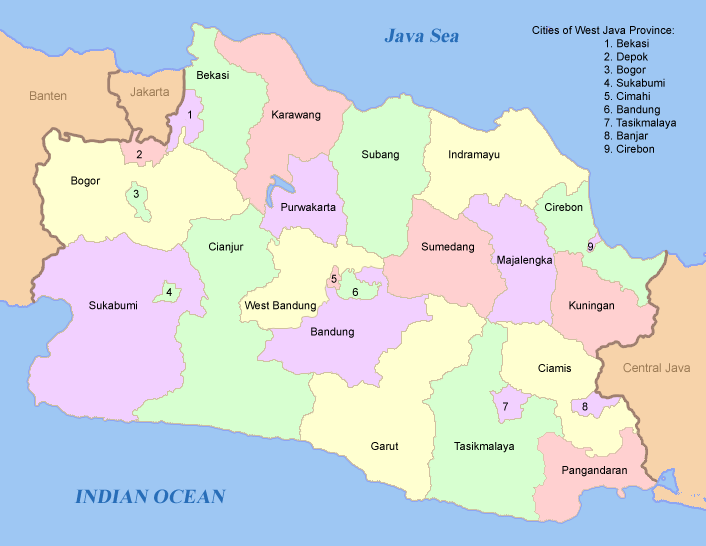
1. Bekasi; 2. Depok; 3. Bogor; 4. Sukabumi; 5. Cimahi; 6. Bandung; 7. Tasikmalaya; 8. Banjar; 9. Cirebon	Regencies: Bekasi Regency; Bogor Regency; Sukabumi Regency; Cianjur Regency; West Bandung Regency; Bandung Regency; Garut Regency; Tasikmalaya Regency; Pangandaran Regency; Ciamis Regency; Kuningan Regency; Cirebon Regency; Majalengka Regency; Sumedang Regency; Indramayu Regency; Subang Regency; Purwakarta Regency; Karawang Regency

Coat of arms	Region Code	Name of Regency or City	Seat	Area in km^{2}	Pop'n 2010 Census	Pop'n 2020 Census	Pop'n mid 2025 Estimate	Pop'n Density mid 2025 (per km^{2})
	32.01	Bogor Regency	Cibinong	2,991.78	4,771,932	5,427,068	5,721,620	1,912
	32.16	Bekasi Regency	Central Cikarang	1,255.00	2,630,401	3,113,017	3,303,020	2,632
	32.71	Bogor City		111.17	950,334	1,043,070	1,083,780	9,749
	32.75	Bekasi City		213.04	2,334,871	2,543,676	2,648,270	12,431
	32.76	Depok City		199.91	1,738,570	2,056,335	2,167,960	10,845
Bodebek region totals				4,770.90	12,426,108	14,183,166	14,924,650	3,128
	32.02	Sukabumi Regency	Palabuhanratu	4,163.82	2,341,409	2,725,450	2,852,110	685
	32.03	Cianjur Regency	Cianjur	3,631.97	2,171,281	2,477,560	2,610,320	719
	32.72	Sukabumi City		48.31	298,681	346,325	370,680	7,673
West Parahyangan region totals				7,844.10	4,811,371	5,549,335	5,833,110	744
	32.04	Bandung Regency	Soreang	1,740.84	3,178,543	3,623,790	3,783,210	2,173
pus	32.11	Sumedang Regency	North Sumedang	1,566.20	1,093,602	1,152,507	1,195,530	763
	32.17	West Bandung Regency (Bandung Barat)	Ngamprah	1,283.44	1,510,284	1,788,336	1,907,820	1,486
	32.73	Bandung City		166.59	2,394,873	2,444,160	2,548,780	15,300
	32.77	Cimahi City		42.43	541,177	568,400	606,380	14,291
Central Parahyangan region totals				4,799.50	8,718,479	9,577,193	10,041,720	2,092
	32.05	Garut Regency	South Tarogong	3,101.13	2,404,121	2,585,607	2,748,700	886
	32.06	Tasikmalaya Regency	Singaparna	2,706.97	1,675,675	1,865,203	1,933,810	714
	32.07	Ciamis Regency	Ciamis	1,595.94	1,148,656	1,229,069	1,266,330	793
	32.18	Pangandaran Regency	Parigi	1,128.12	383,848	423,667	436,490	387
	32.78	Tasikmalaya City		182.96	635,464	716,155	759,370	4,150
	32.79	Banjar City		131.01	175,157	200,973	211,960	1,618
East Parahyangan region totals				8,846.13	6,422,921	7,020,674	7,356,660	832
	32.08	Kuningan Regency	Kuningan	1,193.45	1,035,589	1,167,686	1,225,490	1,027
	32.09	Cirebon Regency	Sumber	1,073.77	2,067,196	2,270,621	2,413,810	2,248
	32.10	Majalengka Regency	Majalengka	1,331.55	1,166,473	1,305,476	1,363,760	1,024
pus	32.12	Indramayu Regency	Indramayu	2,076.27	1,663,737	1,834,434	1,932,520	931
	32.74	Cirebon City		39.40	296,389	333,303	347,540	8,821
Rebana region totals				5,714.44	6,229,384	6,911,520	7,283,120	1,275
pus	32.13	Subang Regency	Subang	2,168.91	1,465,157	1,595,320	1,675,520	773
pus	32.14	Purwakarta Regency	Purwakarta	993.09	852,521	997,869	1,062,970	1,070
pus	32.15	Karawang Regency	West Karawang	1,916.06	2,127,791	2,439,085	2,581,250	1,347
Purwasuka region totals				5,078.06	4,445,469	5,032,274	5,319,740	1,048
Totals for all regions				37,053.33	43,053,732	48,274,162	50,759,003	1,370

Much of the population growth has been in the northwest corner of the province, in those areas bordering Jakarta and forming part of the Jakarta metropolitan area. These comprise Bekasi and Bogor Regencies, together with the separate cities of Bekasi, Bogor and Depok, in the area collectively described as the Bodebek region (an acronym of BogorDepokBekasi); in total they cover an area of 4,770.90 km^{2} (about the same area as the Scottish Borders council area) and had a population estimated at 14,924,650 in mid 2025; and officially projected to reach 15,007,720 in mid 2026.

The province comprises eleven of Indonesia's 84 national electoral districts to elect members to the People's Representative Council. The province's 91 elected members are comprised as follows:

- The West Java I Electoral District consists of the cities of Bandung and Cimahi, and elects 7 members to the People's Representative Council.
- The West Java II Electoral District consists of the regencies of Bandung and West Bandung, and elects 10 members to the People's Representative Council.
- The West Java III Electoral District consists of the regency of Cianjur, together with the city of Bogor (these two areas are non adjacent), and elects 9 members to the People's Representative Council.
- The West Java IV Electoral District consists of the regency of Sukabumi and city of Sukabumi, and elects 6 members to the People's Representative Council.
- The West Java V Electoral District consists solely of the regency of Bogor, and elects 9 members to the People's Representative Council.
- The West Java VI Electoral District consists of the cities of Bekasi and Depok, and elects 6 members to the People's Representative Council.
- The West Java VII Electoral District consists of the regencies of Bekasi, Karawang and Purwakarta, and elects 10 members to the People's Representative Council.
- The West Java VIII Electoral District consists of the regencies of Cirebon and Indramayu, together with the city of Cirebon, and elects 9 members to the People's Representative Council.
- The West Java IX Electoral District consists of the regencies of Subang, Sumedang and Majalenka, and elects 8 members to the People's Representative Council.
- The West Java X Electoral District consists of the regencies of Ciamis, Kuningan and Pangandaran, together with the city of Banjar, and elects 7 members to the People's Representative Council.
- The West Java XI Electoral District consists of the regencies of Garut and Tasikmalaya, together with the city of Tasikmalaya, and elects 10 members to the People's Representative Council.

=== Human Development Index ===
Cities and regencies of West Java by Human Development Index in 2024 0.801 above 0.751 to 0.800 0.701 to 0.750 0.651 to 0.700

Cities and Regencies in West Java range high to medium Human Development Index (HDI).

#	City / Regency	HDI (2024 data)
Very high human development
1	Bandung City	0.835
2	Bekasi City	0.835
3	Depok City	0.829
4	Cimahi City	0.800
High human development
5	Bogor City	0.785
6	Cirebon City	0.770
7	Sukabumi City	0.768
8	Bekasi Regency	0.764
9	Tasikmalaya City	0.750
-	West Java	0.744
-	Indonesia	0.742
10	Bandung Regency	0.742
11	Sumedang Regency	0.737
12	Banjar City	0.736
13	Karawang Regency	0.729
14	Purwakarta Regency	0.726
15	Ciamis Regency	0.725
16	Bogor Regency	0.723
17	Cirebon Regency	0.714
18	Subang Regency	0.713
19	Kuningan Regency	0.712
20	West Bandung Regency	0.700
Medium human development
21	Pangandaran Regency	0.698
22	Indramayu Regency	0.698
23	Majalengka Regency	0.697
24	Sukabumi Regency	0.689
25	Garut Regency	0.687
26	Tasikmalaya Regency	0.683
27	Cianjur Regency	0.672

== Geography ==
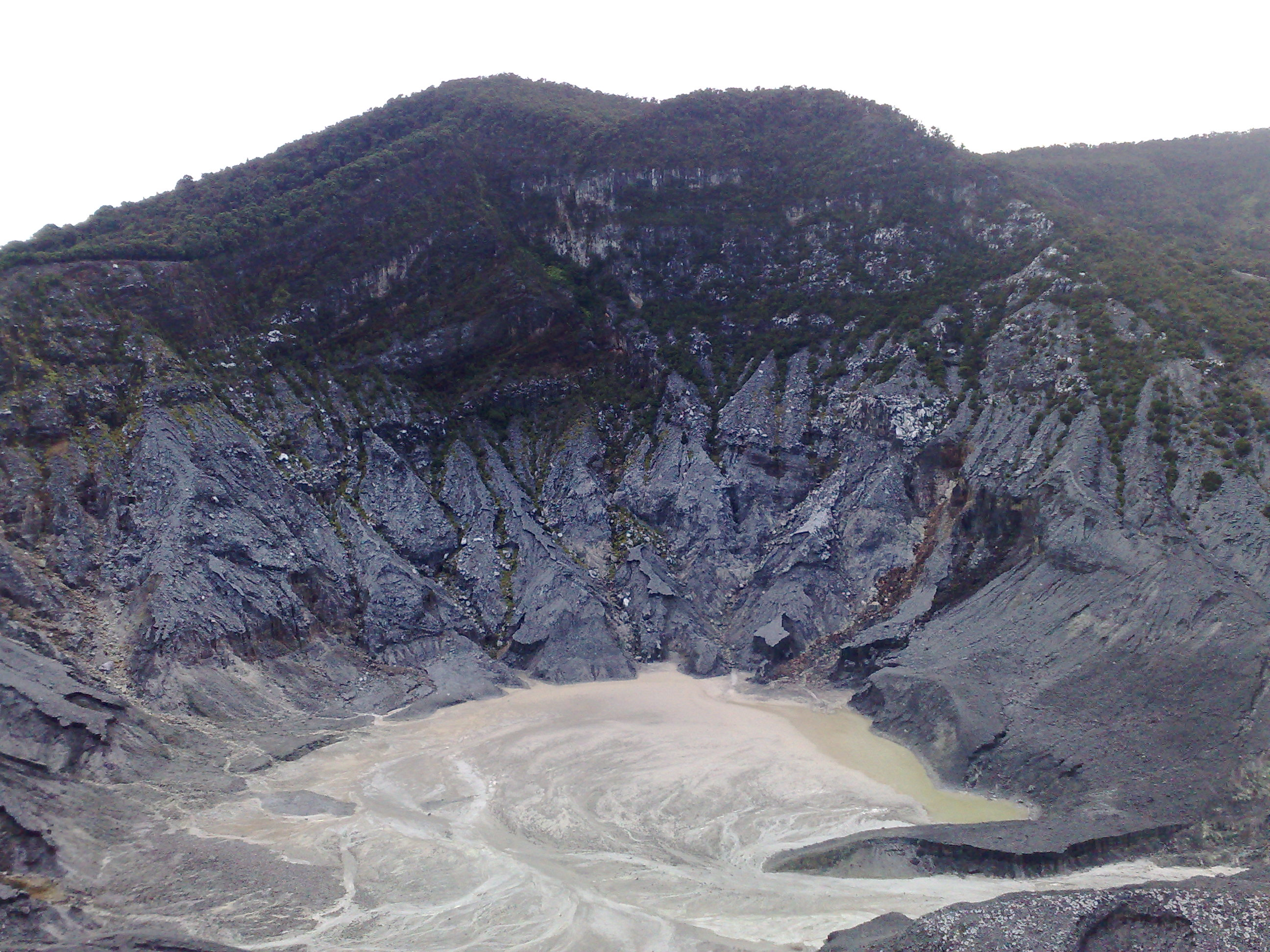
View of the mount and the crater of Tangkuban Parahu in Lembang. Tangkuban Parahu is the centre point of Sundanese culture according to the local legend of Sangkuriang

West Java borders Jakarta and Banten province to the west and Central Java to the east. To the north is the Java Sea. To the south is the Indian Ocean. Unlike most other provinces in Indonesia which have their capitals in coastal areas, the provincial capital, Bandung, is located in the mountainous area in the centre of the province. Banten Province was formerly part of West Java but was created a separate province in 2000. West Java, in the densely populated western third of Java and covering a land area of 37,053.33 km^{2} (larger than Guinea-Bissau or Ulyanovsk Oblast), is home to almost one out of every five Indonesians.

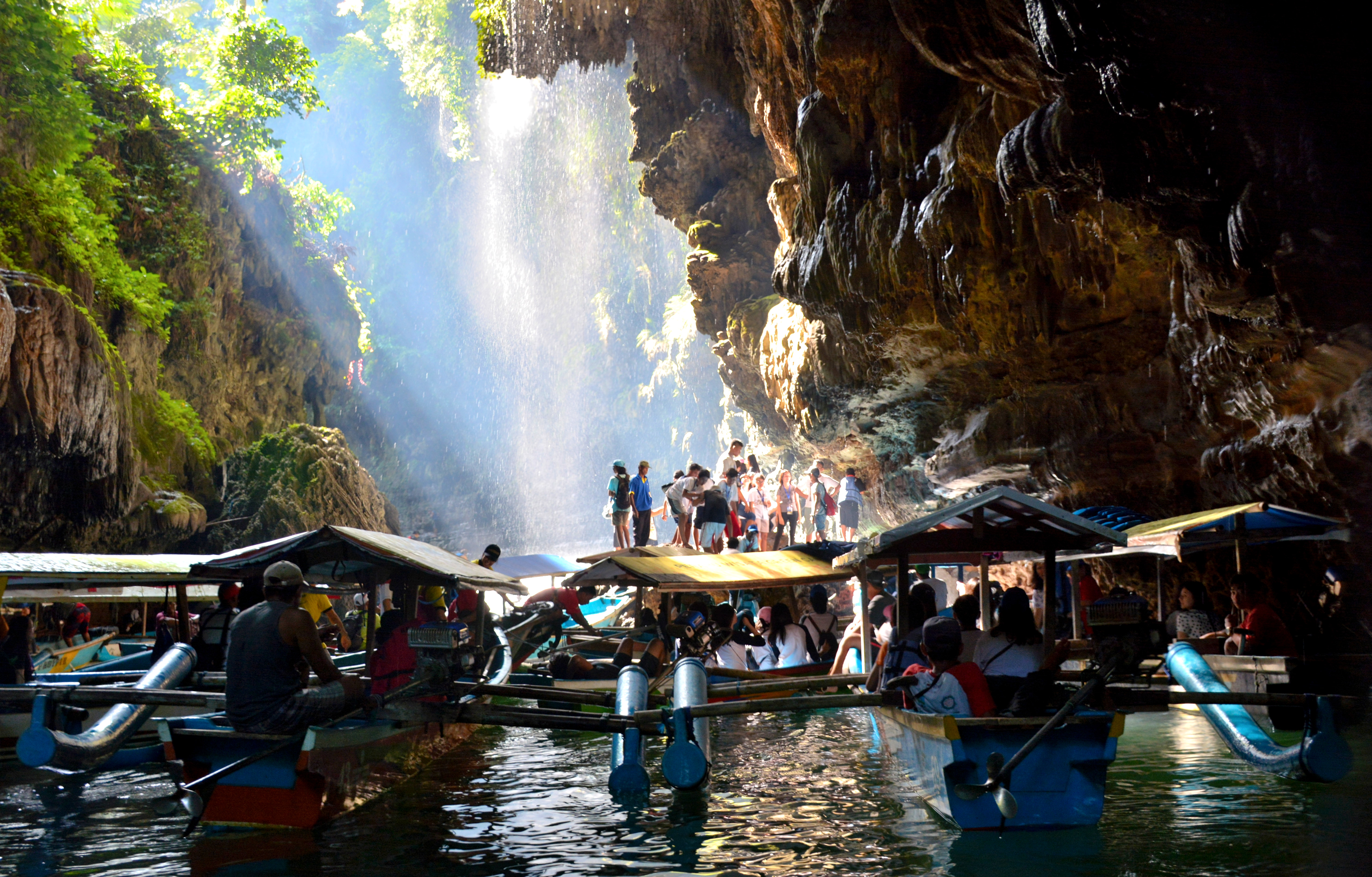
View of the canyon of Cukang Taneuh, which is a famous canyon in West Java

West Java and Banten provinces, as a part of the Pacific Ring of Fire, have more mountains and volcanoes than any of the other provinces in Indonesia. The vast volcanic mountainous region of inland West Java is traditionally known as Parahyangan (also known as Priangan or Preanger) which means "The abode of hyangs (gods)". It is considered as the heartland of the Sundanese people. The highest point of West Java is the stratovolcano Mount Cereme (3,078 metres) bordering Kuningan and Majalengka Regencies. West Java has rich and fertile volcanic soil. Agriculture, mostly traditional dry rice cultivation (known as ladang or huma), has become the primary way of life of traditional Sundanese people. Since the era of the Dutch East India Company (VOC), West Java has been known as a productive plantation area for coffee, tea, quinine, and many other cash crops. The mountainous region of West Java is also a major producer of vegetables and decorative flowering plants. The landscape of the province is one of volcanic mountains, rugged terrain, forest, mountains, rivers, fertile agricultural land, and natural sea harbours.

Flowing through the Bandung Basin to the northeast is the Tarum River (or Ci-tarum), the longest and most important river in the province. This 300-km long river is the site of three dams, namely Cirata Dam, Saguling Dam, and Jatiluhur Dam.

== Economy ==
West Java GDP share by sector (2022)
1. Manufacturing (42.2%)
2. Service (39.1%)
3. Other Industrial (10.1%)
4. Agriculture (8.57%)

Initially, the economy of the Sundanese people in West Java relied heavily on rice cultivation. Ancient kingdoms established in the province such as the Tarumanagara and Sunda Kingdom are known to have relied on rice taxes and agriculture revenues. The cycle of life of the ancient Sundanese people revolved around the rice crop cycle. Traditional rice harvest festivals such as the Seren Taun were important. The ancient goddess of rice, Nyai Pohaci Sanghyang Asri, is revered in Sundanese culture. Traditionally, Sundanese people often used dry rice cultivation (ladang). After the Mataram expanded to the Priangan area in the early 17th century following the Sultan Agung campaign against Dutch Batavia, sawah (wet rice cultivation) began to be adopted in the northern lowlands of West Java. Regencies such as Indramayu, Cirebon, Subang, Karawang and Bekasi are now well known as vital rice-producing areas. The mountainous region of West Java supplies vegetables, flower and much horticultural produce to Jakarta and Bandung, while animal farms in West Java produce dairy products and meats.

=== Colonial period ===
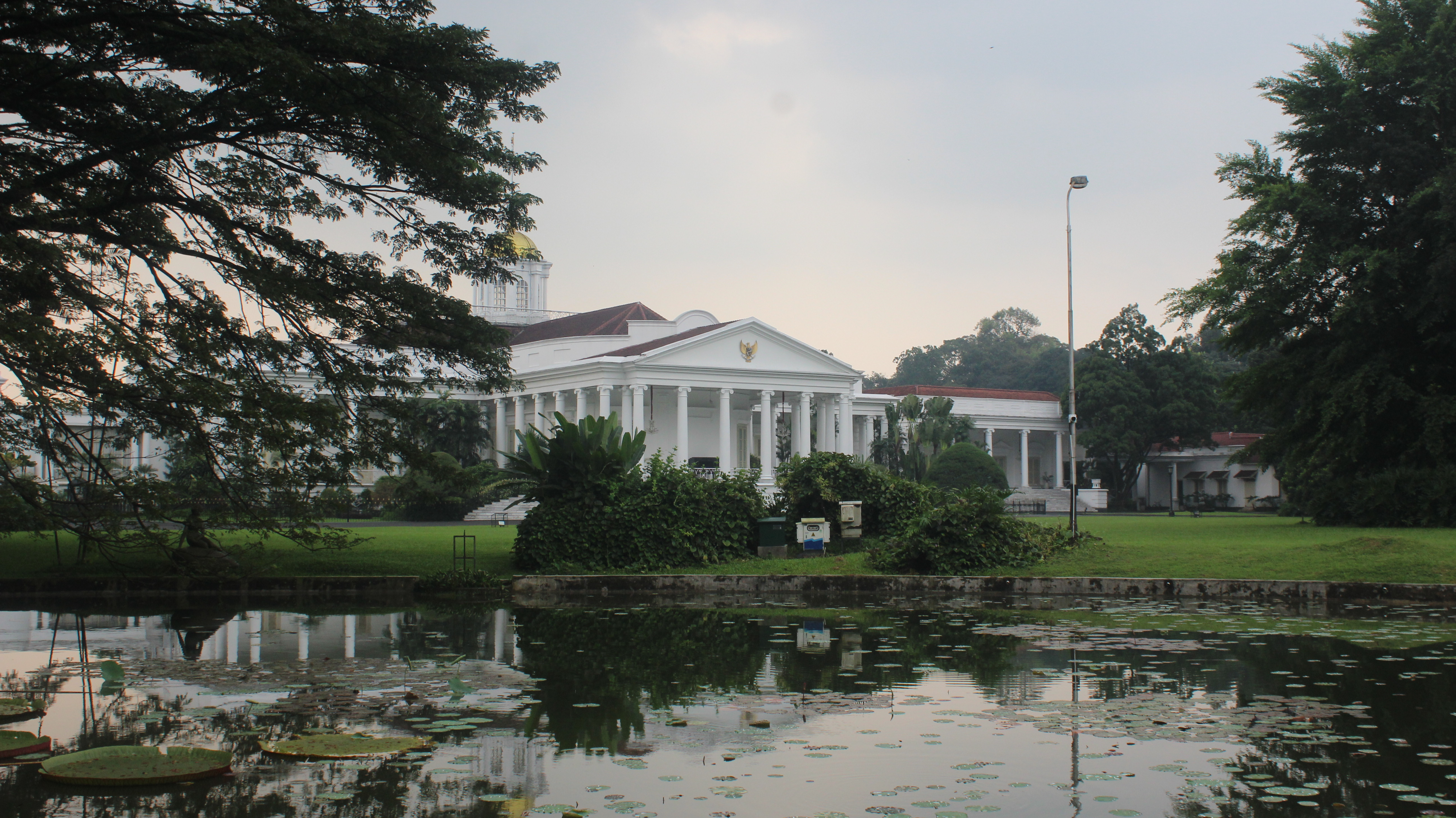
Bogor Palace seen from the Bogor Botanical Garden

During the entire Dutch colonial era, West Java fell under Dutch administration centered in Batavia. The Dutch colonial government introduced cash crops such as tea, coffee, and quinine. Since the 18th century, West Java (known as "De Preanger") was known as a productive plantation area and became integrated with global trade and economy. Services such as transportation and banking were provided to cater for wealthy Dutch plantation owners. West Java is known as one of the earliest developed regions in the Indonesian archipelago. In the early 20th century, the Dutch colonial government developed infrastructures for economic purposes, especially to support Dutch plantations in the region. Roads and railways were constructed to connect inland plantations area with urban centres such as Bandung and the port of Batavia.

=== Post independence ===
After Indonesian independence in 1945, West Java became a supporting region for Jakarta, the capital of Indonesia. Jakarta remained as the business and political centre of Indonesia. Several regencies and cities in West Java such as Bogor, Bekasi and Depok were developed as supporting areas for Jakarta and came to form the Greater Jakarta area or Jabodetabek (Jakarta, Bogor, Depok, Tangerang and Bekasi). The northern area of West Java has become a major industrial area, with areas such as Bekasi, Cikarang and Karawang sprawling with factories and industries. The area in and around Bandung has also developed as an industrial area.

=== Natural resources ===
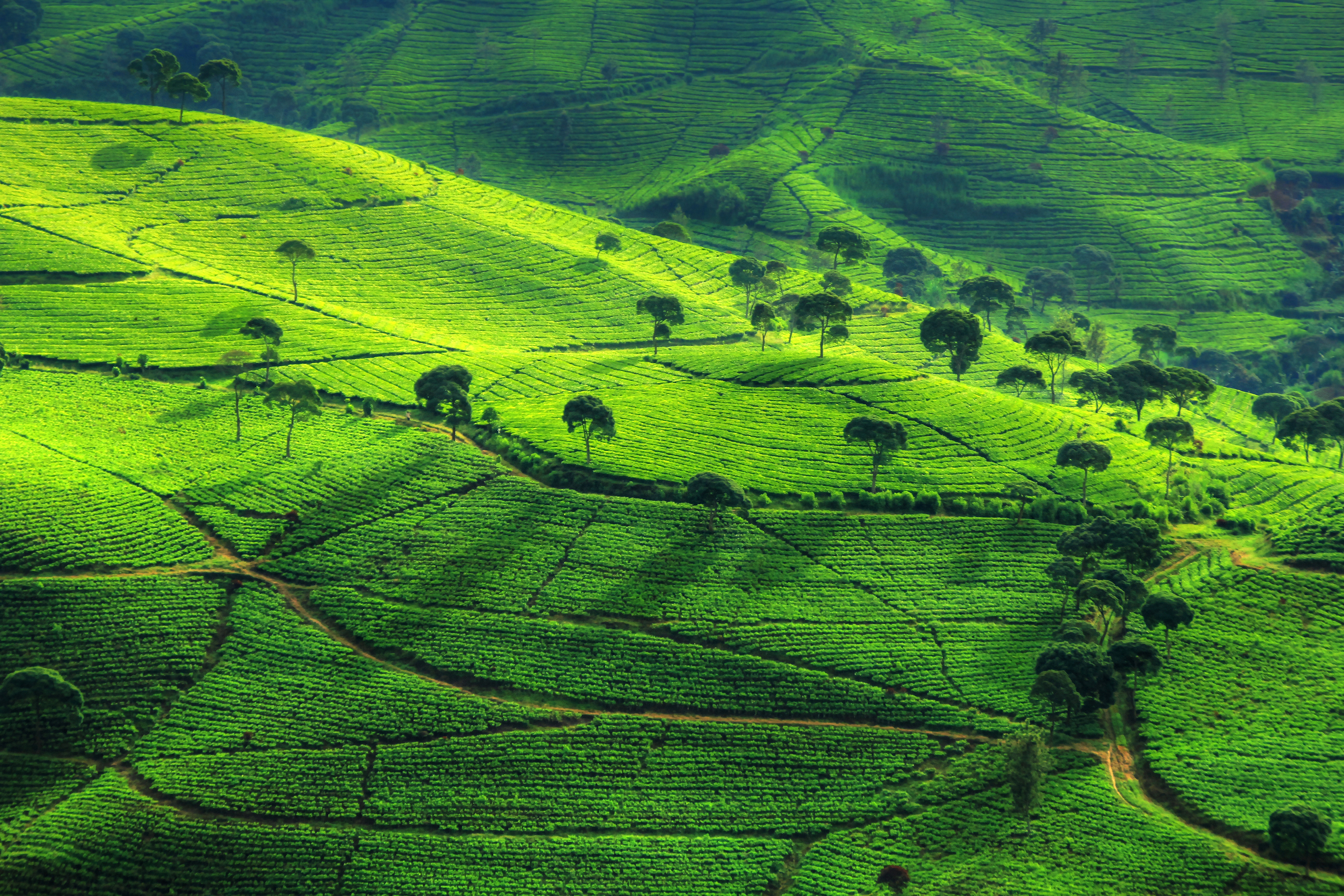
Tea plantations in Pangalengan. Tea plantations are a common sight across mountainous West Java

Based on the data from Indonesia State Secretary, the total area of rice fields in West Java Province in 2006 was 9,488,623 km which produced 9,418,882 tons of paddy in 2006, consisting of 9,103,800 tons rice field paddy and 315,082 tons farmland paddy. Palawija (non-rice food) production, reached 2,044,674 tons with productivity 179.28 quintal per ha. Nevertheless, the widest plant's width is for corn commodity which reaches 148,505 ha. West Java also produces horticulture consists of 2,938,624 tons vegetables, 3,193,744 tons fruits, and 159,871 tons medicines plants/ bio pharmacology.

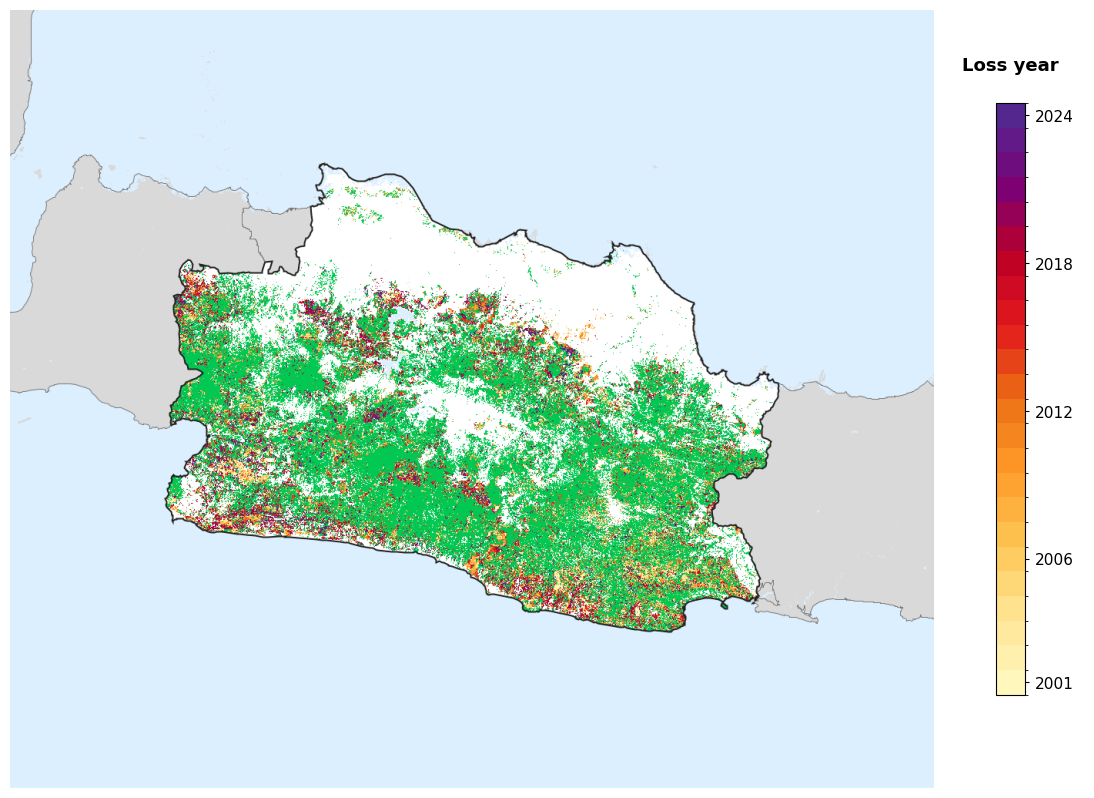
Tree-cover loss year in West Java, 2001-2024, from the Global Forest Change dataset.

Forest in West Java covers 764,387.59 ha or 20.62% from the total size of the province. It consists of productive forest 362,980.40 ha (9.79%), protected forest 228,727.11 ha (6.17%), and conservation forest 172,680 ha (4.63%). Mangrove forest reaches 40,129.89 ha, and spread in 10 regencies where coasts are available. Besides, there is also another protected forest of about 32,313.59 ha organized by Perum Perhutani Unit III West Java and Banten.

From the productive forest, in 2006 West Java harvested crop of about 200,675 m³ wood, although the need for wood in this province every year is about 4 million m³. Until 2006, populace forest's width 214,892 ha with wood production is about 893,851.75 m³. West Java also produces non-forest's crop which is potential enough to be developed as forestry work, such as silk, mushroom, pine, dammar, maleleuca, rattan, bamboo, and swallow bird's nest.

In the fishery sector, commodities include goldfish, nila fish, milkfish, freshwater catfish, windu shrimp, green mussel, gouramy, patin, seaweed and vaname shrimp. In 2006, this province harvested 560,000 tons of fish from fishery cultivation crop and brackish or 63.63% from fishery production total in West Java.

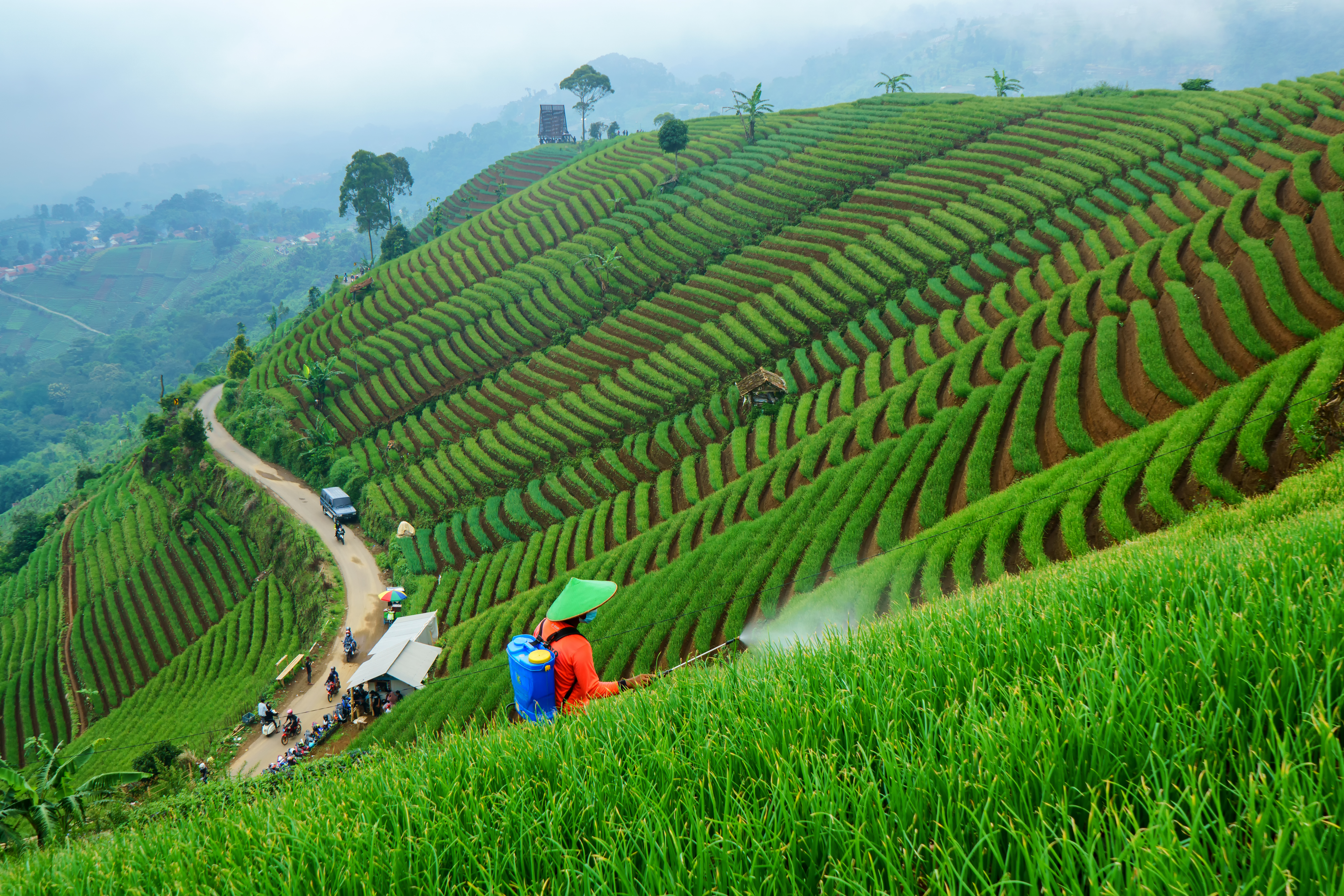
Rice terrace in Panyaweuyan, Majalengka. Rice terraces are grow very well on the island of Java, especially in West Java.

In the poultry field, dairy cow, domestic poultry, and ducks are common commodities in West Java. 2006 data stated that there are 96,796 dairy cows (25% of the national population), 4,249,670 sheep, 28,652,493 domestic poultries, and 5,596,882 ducks (16% of the national population). Now there are only 245,994 beef cattle in West Java (3% national population), whereas the need every year is about 300,000 beef cattle.

This province has many plantation crops, such as tea, cloves, coconut, rubber, cacao, tobacco, coffee, sugar, palm and akar wangi (Chrysopogon zizanioides). From all those commodities, cloves, coconut, rubber, cocoa, tobacco, and coffee are common in West Java. From area side, the best productivity, that is plan area's width equals with the plant's width that produces tobacco and sugar palm commodities. From the production side, the highest productivity is oil palm (6.5 tons per ha) and sugar palm (5.5 tons per ha).

West Java also has several mining operations. In 2006, it contributed 5,284 tons zeolite, 47,978 tons bentonite, iron sand, pozzolan cement, feldspar, and jewel barn/ gemstone. Precious stone mining potential generally is found in Garut, Tasikmalaya, Kuningan, and Sukabumi Regency areas.

As consequences of having many volcanoes, West Java has the potential of geothermal energy. There are eleven points of geothermal energy, and three, i.e. Papandayan, Ceremai, and Gede Pangrango have conducted pre-exploration.

Raw natural resources include chalk, several offshore oilfields in the Java Sea, and lumber. Most of the province is very fertile, with a mix of small farms and larger plantations. There are several hydropower dams, including Jatiluhur, Saguling, Cirata, and Jatigede.

=== Tourism ===
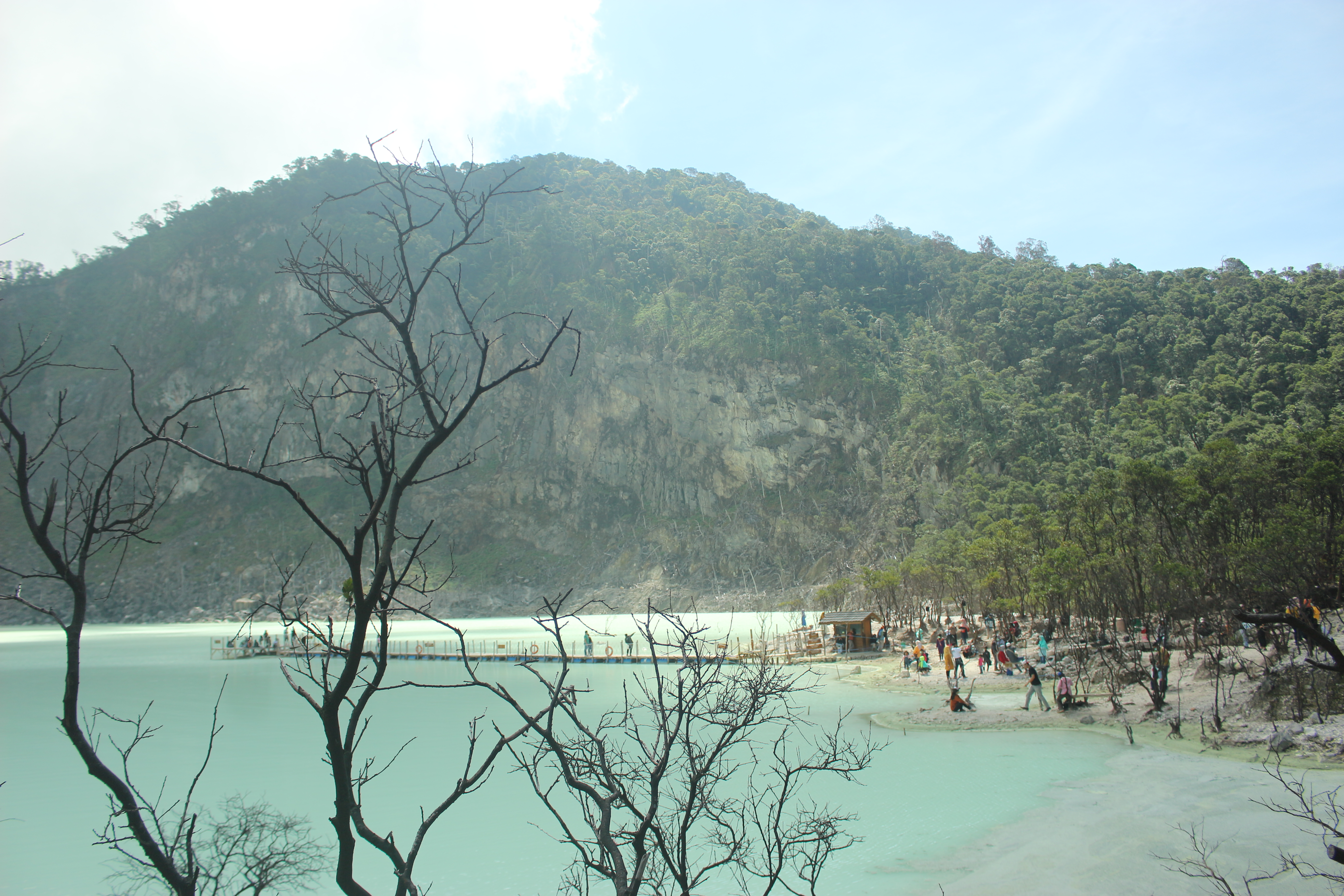
Kawah Putih in Southern Bandung is a Volcanic crater lake

Tourism is an important industry in West Java, and the Bandung and Puncak areas have long been known as popular weekend destinations for Jakartans. Today, Bandung has developed into a historical tourist destination, with the Merdeka Building and Braga Street shopping area popular not only among locals, but also with visitors from Malaysia and Singapore. The history-rich coastal city of Cirebon is also a cultural tourism destination since the city has several kratons and historical sites such as Gua Sunyaragi. Other tourist destinations include the Bogor Botanical Garden, Taman Safari, Tangkuban Perahu crater, Pelabuhanratu Bay, Ciater hot springs, Kawah Putih crater to the south of Bandung, Pangandaran beach, and various mountain resorts in Cianjur, Garut, Tasikmalaya, and Kuningan.

== Demographics ==
Historical population
Year	Pop.	±%
1971	21,623,529	—
1980	27,453,525	+27.0%
1990	35,384,352	+28.9%
1995	39,206,787	+10.8%
2000	35,729,537	−8.9%
2005	38,965,440	+9.1%
2010	43,053,732	+10.5%
2015	46,668,214	+8.4%
2020	48,274,162	+3.4%
2025	50,759,003	+5.1%
2000 Census decline was due to the splitting off of Banten as a separate province. Source: Badan Pusat Statistik, Jakarta, 2026 and previous reports. Note 1995, 2005 and 2015 totals are Inter-Censal estimates.

The population of West Java was 43,053,732 at the 2010 Census and 48,274,162 at the 2020 Census, making it the most populous province of Indonesia, home to 18% of the national total on 1.8% of the country's land. The mid-2025 official estimate was 50,759,003 (comprising 25,682,117 males and 25,076,886 females). Aside from the special district of Jakarta, it is the most densely populated province in the country with an average of 1,370 people per km^{2} (mid 2025 estimate). The average annual population growth rate recorded in the ten years to 2010 was 1.9%, but the growth has since slowed and was just 1.06% between 2020 and 2025.

Data from the 2000 Indonesian census recorded that most of the areas of 22 regencies and cities in West Java in 2000, the majority of the population came from the Sundanese ethnic group, except in Cirebon, Indramayu, Bekasi, and Depok. Cirebon and Indramayu are predominantly Cirebonese with sub-ethnic of Javanese. While Depok and Bekasi, the majority of the population are Betawi. Other tribes from outside Java and other tribes are mostly Bataks, Minangkabau, and Chinese. Generally spread across Bekasi, Depok, Bandung, and Bogor.

=== Ethnic and linguistic composition ===
Ethnic groups in West Java
1. Sundanese (71.9%)
2. Javanese (16.4%)
3. Betawi (5.33%)
4. Others (6.45%)

West Java is the native homeland of the Sundanese people which forms the largest ethnic group in West Java. Since Jakarta and the surrounding area, including West Java, is the business and political centre of Indonesia, the province has attracted various people from other parts of Indonesia. The biggest minority are the Javanese, who migrated to the province centuries ago. Other Native Indonesian ethnic groups such as Minangkabau, Batak, Malay, Madurese, Balinese, Ambonese, and many other Indonesians who migrated to and settled in West Java cities can also be easily found. The urban areas also have a significant population of Chinese Indonesians.

In addition to Indonesian, the official national language, the other widely spoken language in the province is Sundanese. In some areas near the southern borders with Central Java, Javanese is also spoken, especially Banyumasan Javanese, then also the Betawi language which is dominant in the cities of Bekasi, Depok, and half in the western and northern parts of Bekasi Regency, and the northern part of Bogor Regency. The main language spoken in Cirebon and nearby areas (Majalengka, Indramayu, Sumber) is Cirebonese, a dialect of Javanese with Sundanese influence.

=== Religion ===
As of 2022, Islam is the largest religion in West Java, being practiced by 97.34% of the population. Minority religions are Christianity with 4.17%, following by Buddhism 0.2%, Hinduism 0.035%, Confucianism 0.025% and Folk religion 0.01% of the population.

== Cultures ==
The Sundanese share the Java island with the Javanese and primarily live in West Java. Although the Sundanese live on the same island as the Javanese, their culture is distinct and likewise consider themselves to live in a separate cultural area called Pasundan or Tatar Sunda. Someone moving from West Java to Central or East Java is literally said to be moving from Sunda to Java worlds. Bandung is considered as the cultural heartland of Sundanese people, and many indigenous Sundanese artforms were developed in this city. The nearby province of Banten is similar in this regard and is also considered to be part of Pasundan as well.

=== Music ===
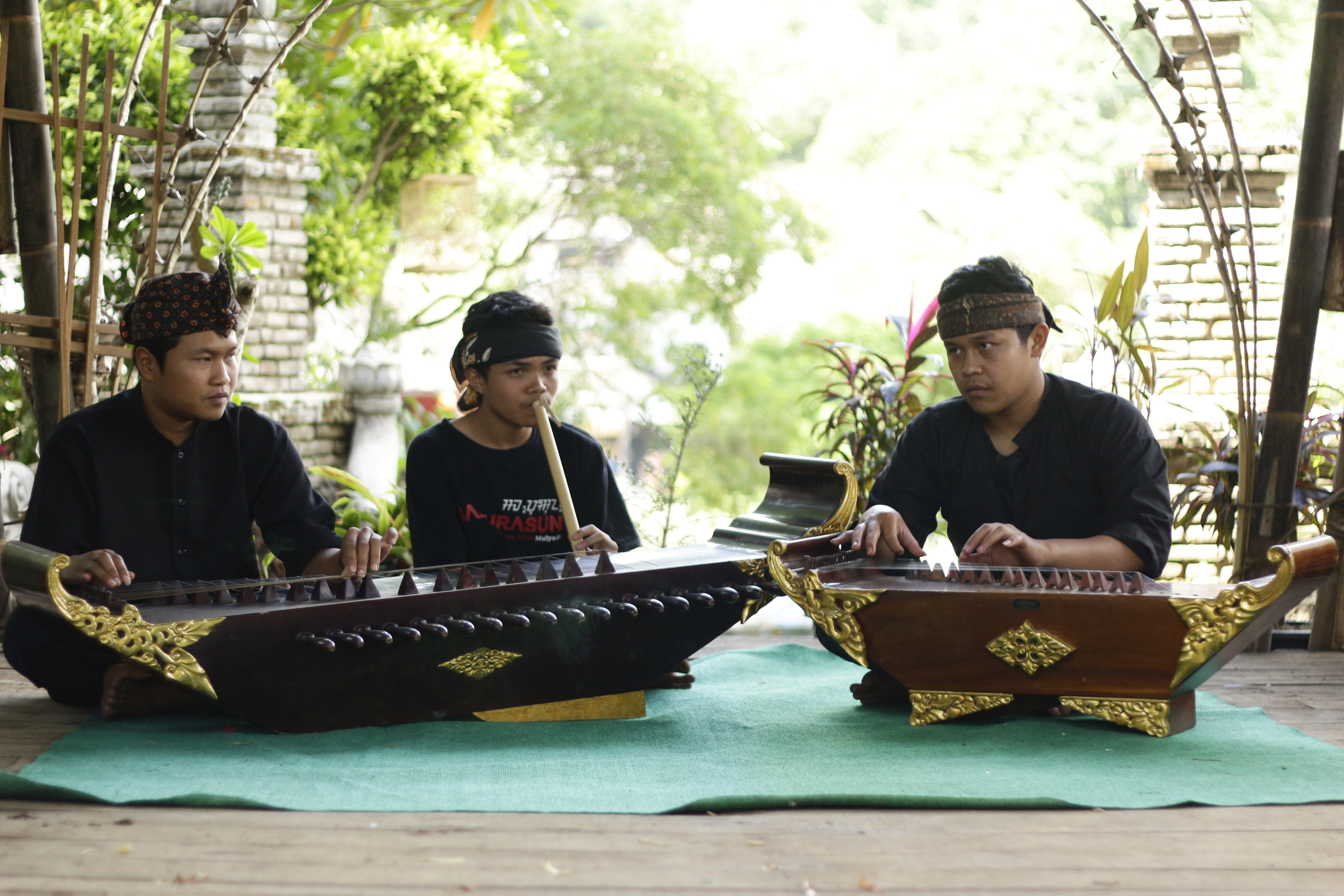
Kacapi and Suling Orchestra

The musical arts of Sunda, which is an expression of the emotions of Sundanese culture, express politeness and grace of Sundanese. Degung orchestra consists of Sundanese gamelan. In addition to the Sundanese forms of Gamelan in Parahyangan, the region of Cirebon retains its own distinct musical traditions. Amongst Cirebons' varying Gamelan ensembles the two most frequently heard are Gamelan Pelog (a non-equidistant heptatonic tuning system) and Gamelan Prawa (a semi-equidistant pentatonic tuning system). Gamelan Pelog is traditionally reserved for Tayuban, Wayang Cepak, and listening and dance music of the Kratons in Cirebon, while Gamelan Prawa is traditionally reserved for Wayang Purwa.

Cirebon also retains specialised Gamelan ensembles including Sekaten, which is played in the Kratons to mark important times in the Islamic calendar, Denggung, also a Kraton ensemble, which is believed to have some "supernatural powers", and Renteng, an ensemble found in both Cirebon and Parahyangan known for its loud and energetic playing style.

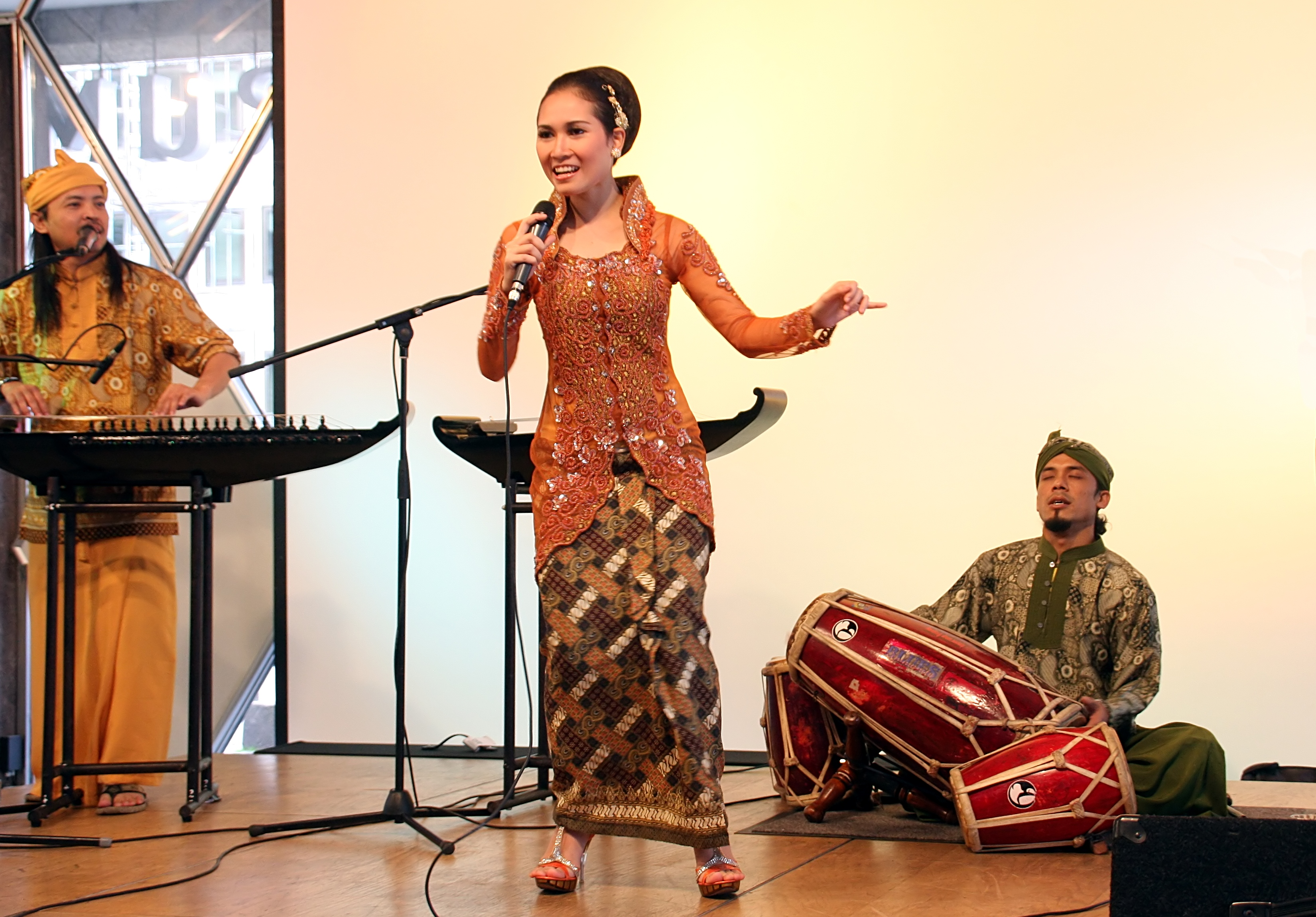
Tembang Sunda performance a origin sundanese vocal music performance in 2010

Tembang Sunda is a genre of Sundanese vocal music accompanied by a core ensemble of two Kacapi (zither) and a Suling (bamboo flute). The music and poetry of tembang Sunda are closely associated with the Parahyangan, the highland plateau that transverses the central and southern parts of Sunda. The natural environment of Priangan, an agricultural region surrounded by mountains and volcanoes, is reflected in some songs of the tembang Sunda.

Kacapi suling is tembang Sunda minus vocal. Tarawangsa is a genuine popular art is performed on ensemble consists of tarawangsa (a violin with an end pin) and the jentreng (a kind of seven-stringed zither). It is accompanied by a secret dance called Jentreng. The dance is a part of a ritual celebrating the goddess of paddy Dewi Sri. Its ceremonial significance is associated with a ritual of thanksgiving associated with the rice harvest. Tarawangsa can also be played for healing or even purely for entertainment.

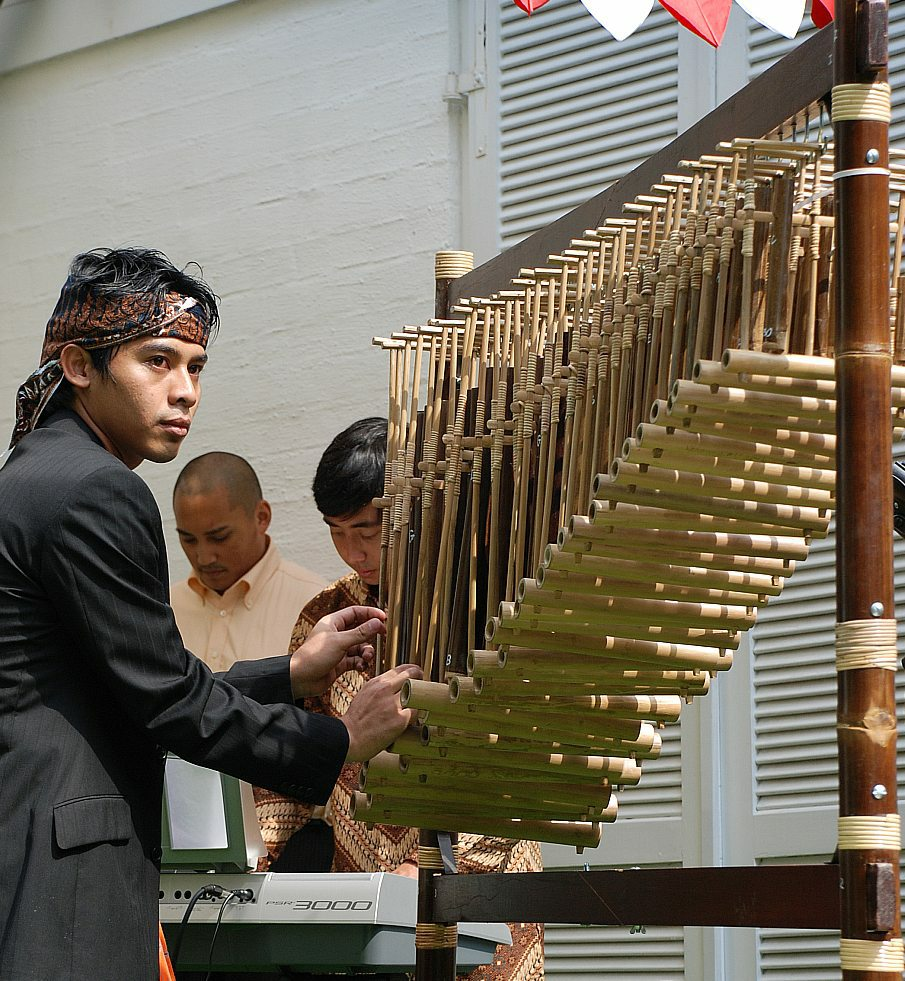
Angklung is one of the most famous musical instruments in West Java

The three main types of Sundanese bamboo ensembles are angklung, calung, karinding and arumba. The exact features of each ensemble vary according to context, related instruments, and relative popularity. Angklung is a generic term for sets of tuned, shaken bamboo rattles. Angklung consists of a frame upon which hang several different lengths of hollow bamboo. Angklungs are played like handbells, with each instrument played to a different note. Angklung rattles are played in interlocking patterns, usually with only one or two instruments played per person. The ensemble is used in Sundanese processions, sometimes with trance or acrobatics.

Performed at life-cycle rituals and feasts (hajat), angklung is believed to maintain balance and harmony in the village. In its most modern incarnation, angklung is performed in schools as an aid to learning music. The Angklung received international attention when Daeng Soetigna, from Bandung, expanded the angklung notations not only to play traditional pélog or sléndro scales but also diatonic scale in 1938. Since then, angklung is often played together with other Western musical instruments in an orchestra. One of the first well-known performances of angklung in an orchestra was during the Bandung Conference in 1955. Like those in angklung, the instruments of the calung ensemble are of bamboo, but each consists of several differently tuned tubes fixed onto a piece of bamboo; the player holds the instrument in his left hand and strikes it with a beater held in his right.

The highest-pitched calung has the highest number of tubes and the densest musical activity; the lowest-pitched, with two tubes, has the least. Calung is nearly always associated with earthy humour, and is played by men. Arumba refers to a set of diatonically tuned bamboo xylophones, often played by women. It is frequently joined by modern instruments, including a drum set, electric guitar, bass, and keyboards.

=== Theatre ===
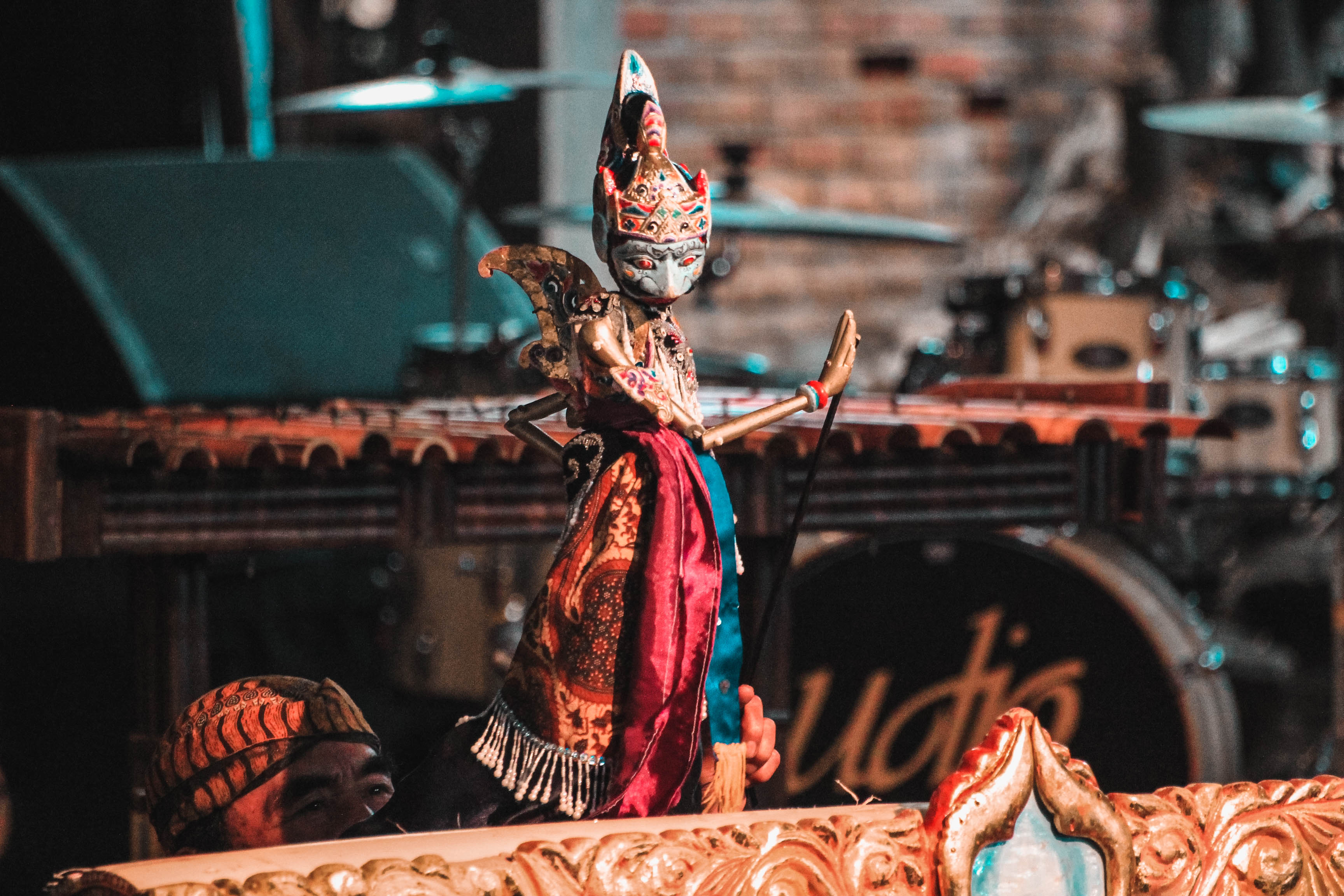
Wayang Golek, a traditional Sundanese puppetry.

Wayang golek is a traditional form of puppetry from Sunda. Unlike the better-known leather shadow puppets (wayang kulit) found in the rest of Java and Bali, wayang golek puppets are made from wood and are three-dimensional, rather than two. They use a banana palm in which the puppets stand, behind which one puppeteer (dalang) is accompanied by his gamelan orchestra with up to 20 musicians. The gamelan uses a five-note scale as opposed to the seven-note western scale. The musicians are guided by the drummer, who in turn is guided by signals from the puppet master dalang gives to change the mood or pace required. Wayang golek are used by the Sundanese to tell the epic play "Mahabarata", and various other morality-type plays. Sandiwara Sunda is a type folk theater performed in Sundanese and presenting Sundanese themes, folklores and stories.

=== Dance ===
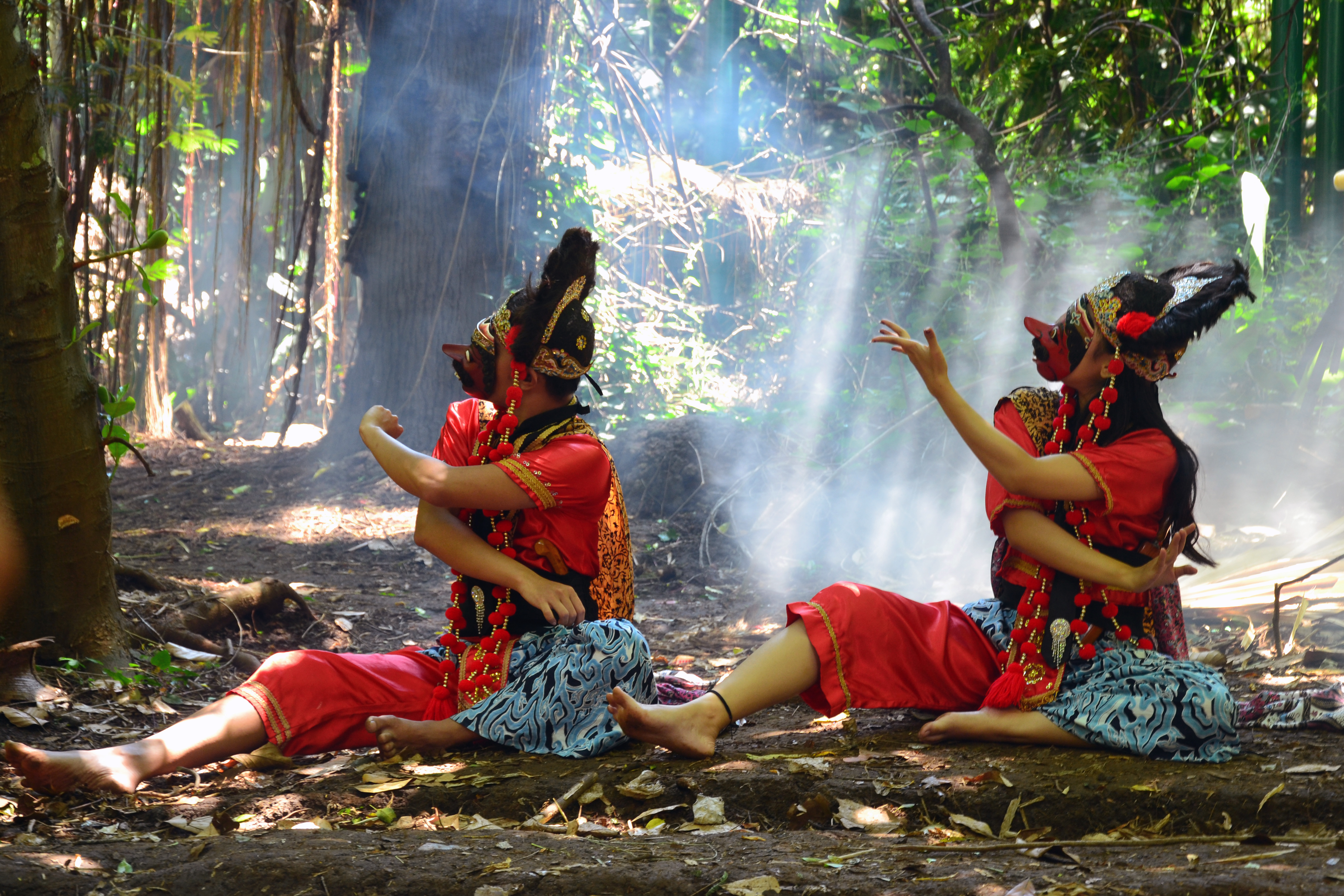
Cirebonese mask dance

Sundanese and Cirebonese dance shows the influence of the many groups that have traded and settled in the area over the centuries, and includes variations from graceful to dynamic syncopated drumming patterns, quick wrist flicks, sensual hip movements, and fast shoulder and torso isolations. Jaipongan is probably the most popular traditional social dance of Sundanese people and Cirebonese mask dance is the most popular traditional social dance of Cirebonese people . It can be performed in solo, groups, or pair. The Tari Merak (Peafowl Dance) is a female dance inspired by the movements of a peafowl and its feathers blended with the classical movements of the Sundanese dance.

=== Folktales and legend stories ===
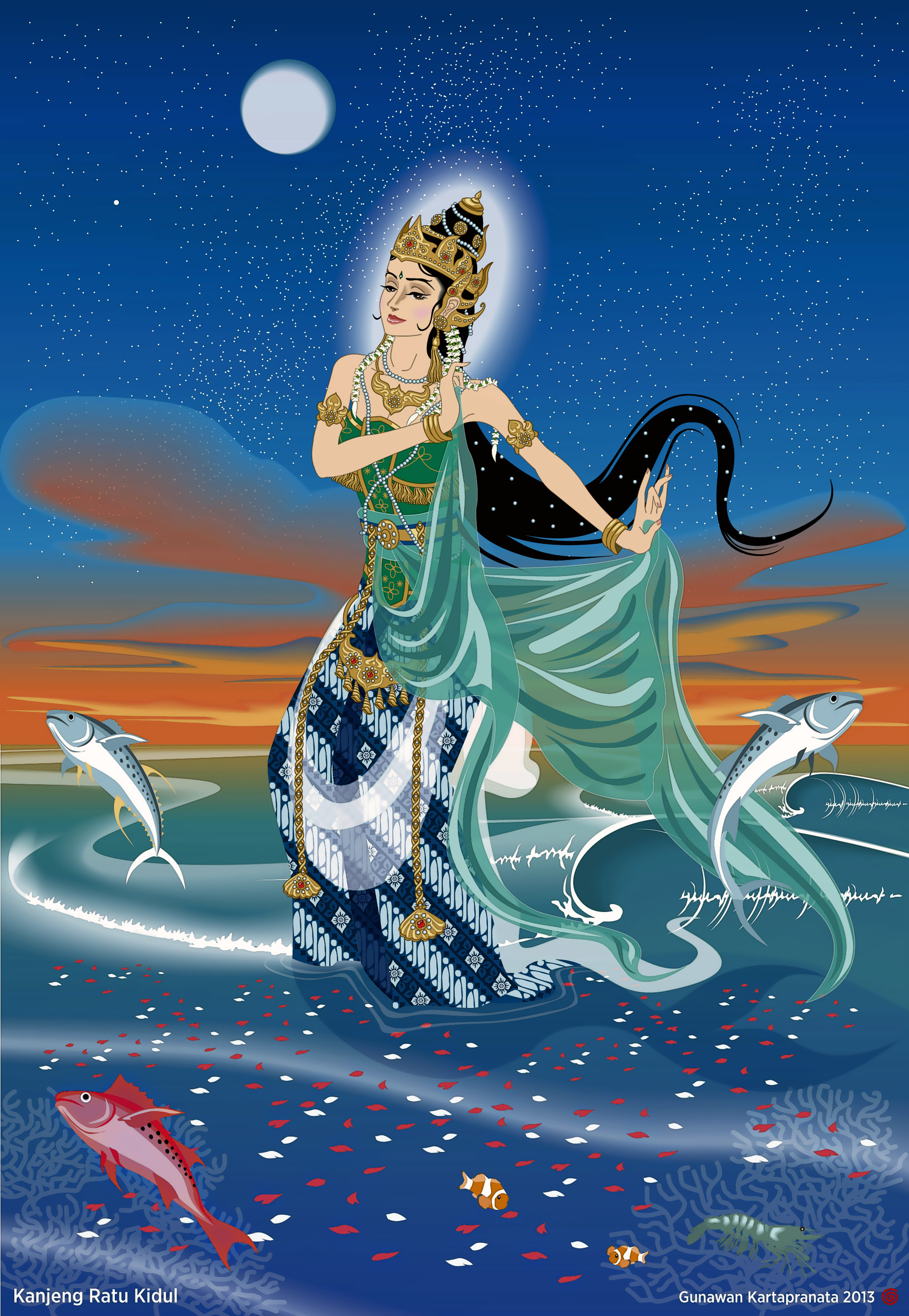
A painting depicting Nyai Loro Kidul

There are stories and folktales transcribed from Pantun Sunda stories. Among the most well-known folktale and stories are:

- Mundinglaya Dikusumah, which tells of Mundinglaya visiting Jabaning Langit to find layang Salaka Domas. It is a symbolic story of Surawisesa visiting Malaka to establish a peace treaty with the Portuguese before 1522.
- Lutung Kasarung, tells the life of a beautiful princess, in the era of Pasir Batang kingdom, a vassal of Sunda kingdom. She faces the evil of her older sister willing to seize her right as a queen.
- Ciung Wanara, tells of the fight of two princes of Sunda kingdom and the history of Cipamali river (present-day Brebes river) as a boundary between Sundanese and Javanese territories.
- Sangkuriang, which tells the story of the creation of Mount Tangkuban Parahu and the ancient lake Bandung.
- Nyai Loro Kidul (also spelt Nyi Roro Kidul) is a legendary female spirit or deity, known as the Queen of the Southern Sea of Java (Indian Ocean or Samudra Kidul south of Java island) in Sundanese as well in Javanese and Balinese mythology.

=== Literature ===
Old Sundanese literature, among others, are:

- Bujangga Manik, which was written on 29 palm leaves and kept in the Bodleian Library in Oxford since 1627, mentioning more than 450 names of places, regions, rivers and mountains situated on Java island, Bali island and Sumatra island.
- Carita Parahyangan, telling Sundanese kings and kingdoms from the pre-Islamic period.
- Siksakandang Karesian, providing the reader with all kinds of religious and moralistic rules, prescriptions and lessons.

== Cuisine ==
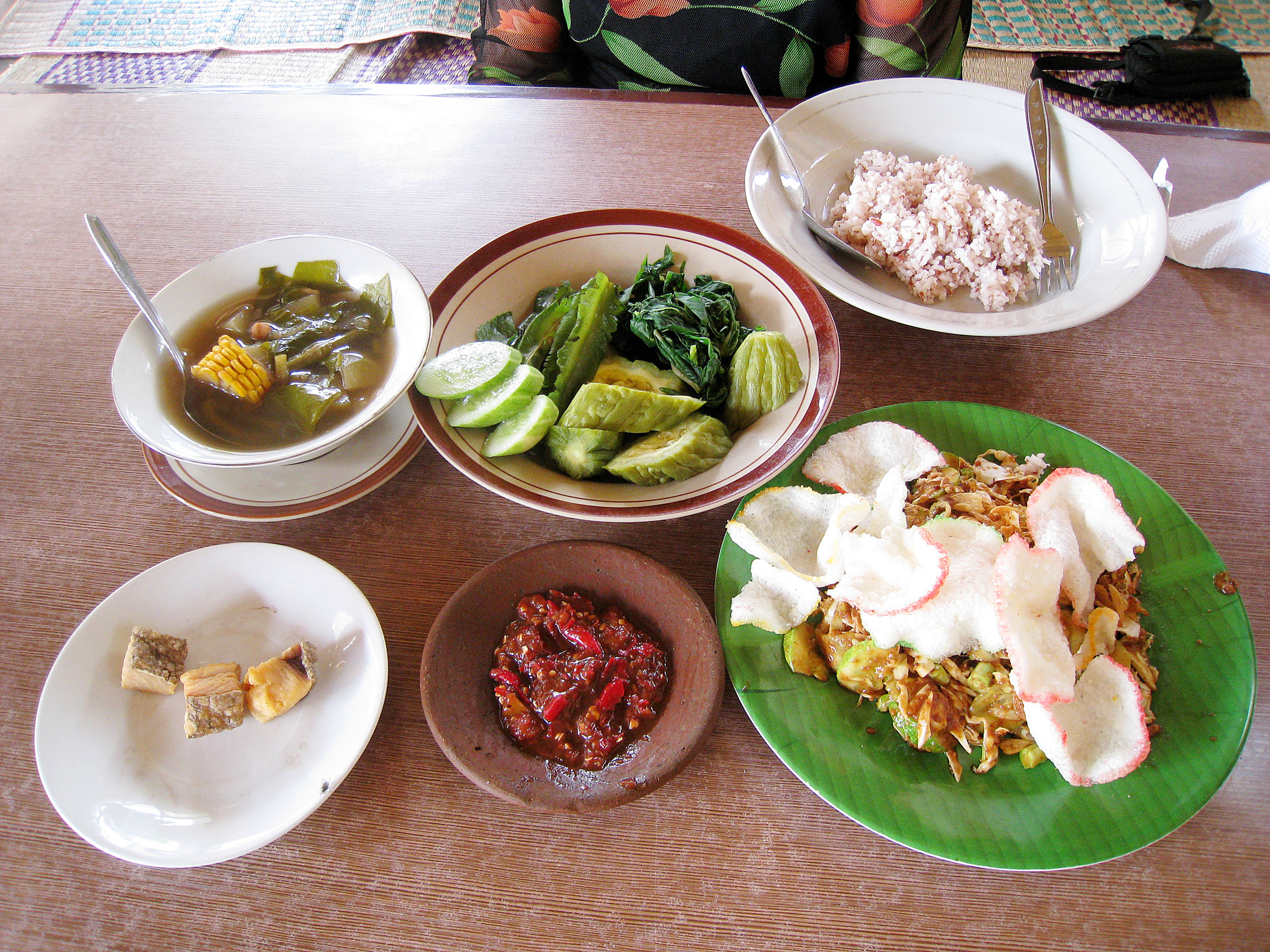
A typical modest Sundanese meal consists of steamed rice, fried salted fish, sayur asem (vegetable with tamarind based soup), lalab sambal (raw vegetables salad with chili paste) and karedok (vegetable salad with peanuts paste).

Sundanese cuisine is one of the most famous traditional food in Indonesia, and it is also easily found in most Indonesian cities. The Sundanese food is characterized by its freshness; the famous lalab (raw vegetables salad) eaten with sambal (chili paste), and also karedok (peanuts paste) demonstrate the Sundanese fondness for fresh raw vegetables. Similar to other ethnic groups in Indonesia, Sundanese people eat rice for almost every meal. The Sundanese like to say, "If you have not eaten rice, then you have not eaten at all." Rice is prepared in hundreds of different ways. However, it is simple steamed rice that serves as the centrepiece of all meals.

Next to steamed rice, the side dishes of vegetables, fish, or meat are added to provide a variety of tastes as well as for protein, mineral and nutrient intake. These side dishes are grilled, fried, steamed or boiled and spiced with any combination of garlic, galangal (a plant of the ginger family), turmeric, coriander, ginger, and lemongrass. The herb-rich food wrapped and cooked inside banana leaf called pepes (Sundanese: pais) is popular among Sundanese people. Pepes are available in many varieties according to their ingredients; carp fish, anchovies, minced meat with eggs, mushroom, tofu or oncom. Oncom is a fermented peanut-based ingredient that is prevalent within Sundanese cuisine, just like its counterpart, Tempe, which is popular among Javanese people. Usually, the food itself is not too spicy, but it is served with a boiling sauce made by grinding chilli peppers and garlic together. On the coast, saltwater fish are common; in the mountains, fish tend to be either pond-raised carp or goldfish. A well-known Sundanese dish is lalapan, which consists only of raw vegetables, such as papaya leaves, cucumber, eggplant, and bitter melon.

== Transportation ==
=== Toll roads ===
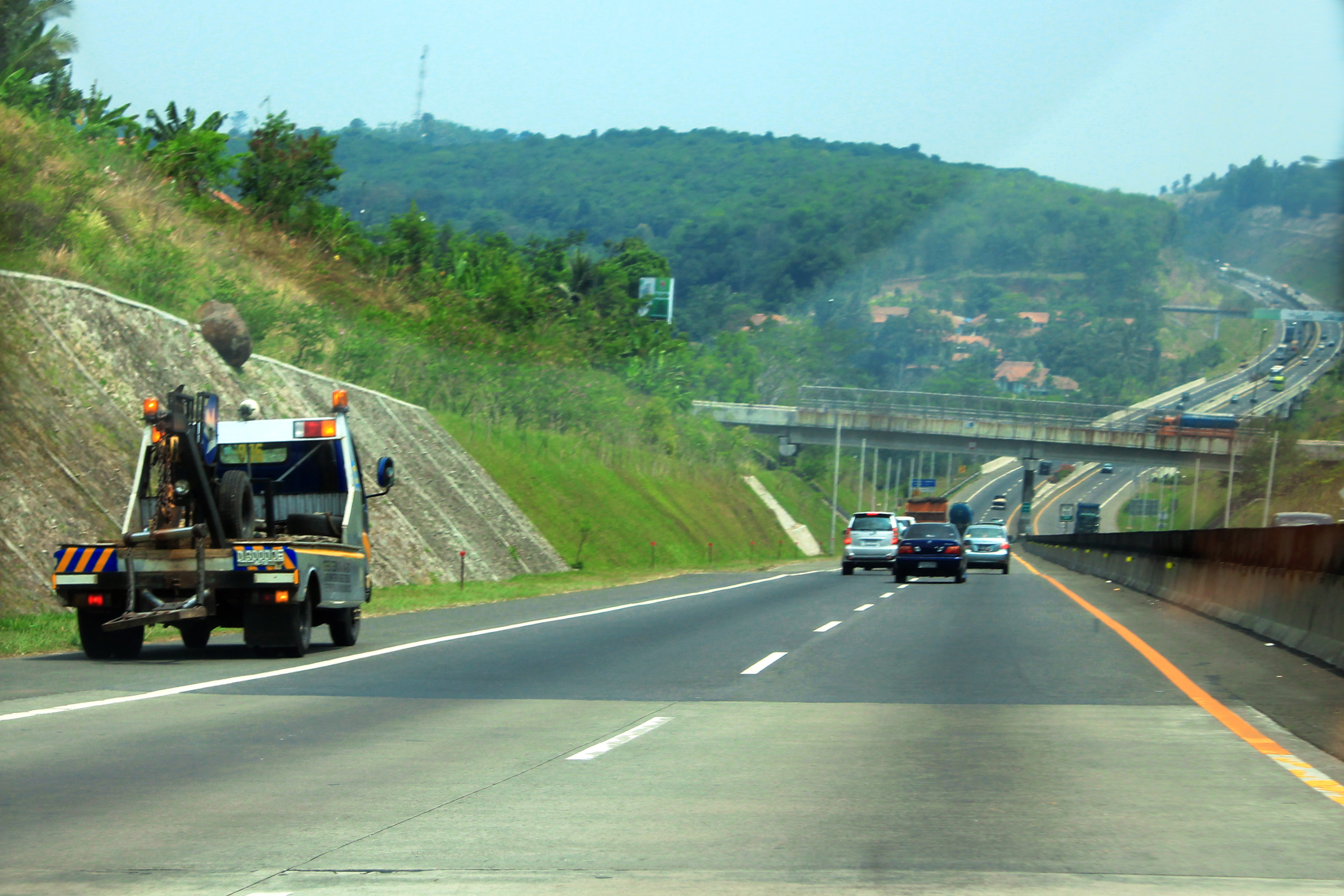
Cipularang Toll Road

Due to its proximity to Jakarta and its growing population and industry, West Java has the longest tolled highway road of any provinces. As of April 2015, there are several toll roads in West Java

- Jakarta–Cikampek Toll Road (73 km)
- Depok–Antasari Toll Road (21.54 km)
- Becakayu Toll Road (21.04 km)
- Cisumdawu Toll Road (60.5 km)
- Cipularang Toll Road (58.5 km)
- Padalarang–Cileunyi Toll Road (33 km)
- Jagorawi Toll Road (46 km)
- Palimanan–Kanci Toll Road (28.8 km)
- Bogor Ring Road (partially built)
- Kanci–Pejagan Toll Road (35 km)
- Cikopo–Palimanan Toll Road (116 km)
- Soreang–Pasir Koja Toll Road (10.6 km)
- Bocimi Toll Road (built: Bogor-Cigombong) (15.3 km)

In addition to completed highways there are some highways that are being built.

Several other proposed toll roads are Bandung Intra-Urban Toll Road, Cileunyi–Tasikmalaya, and Jakarta Outer Ring Road 2 (a section of this road has been built).

=== Railways ===
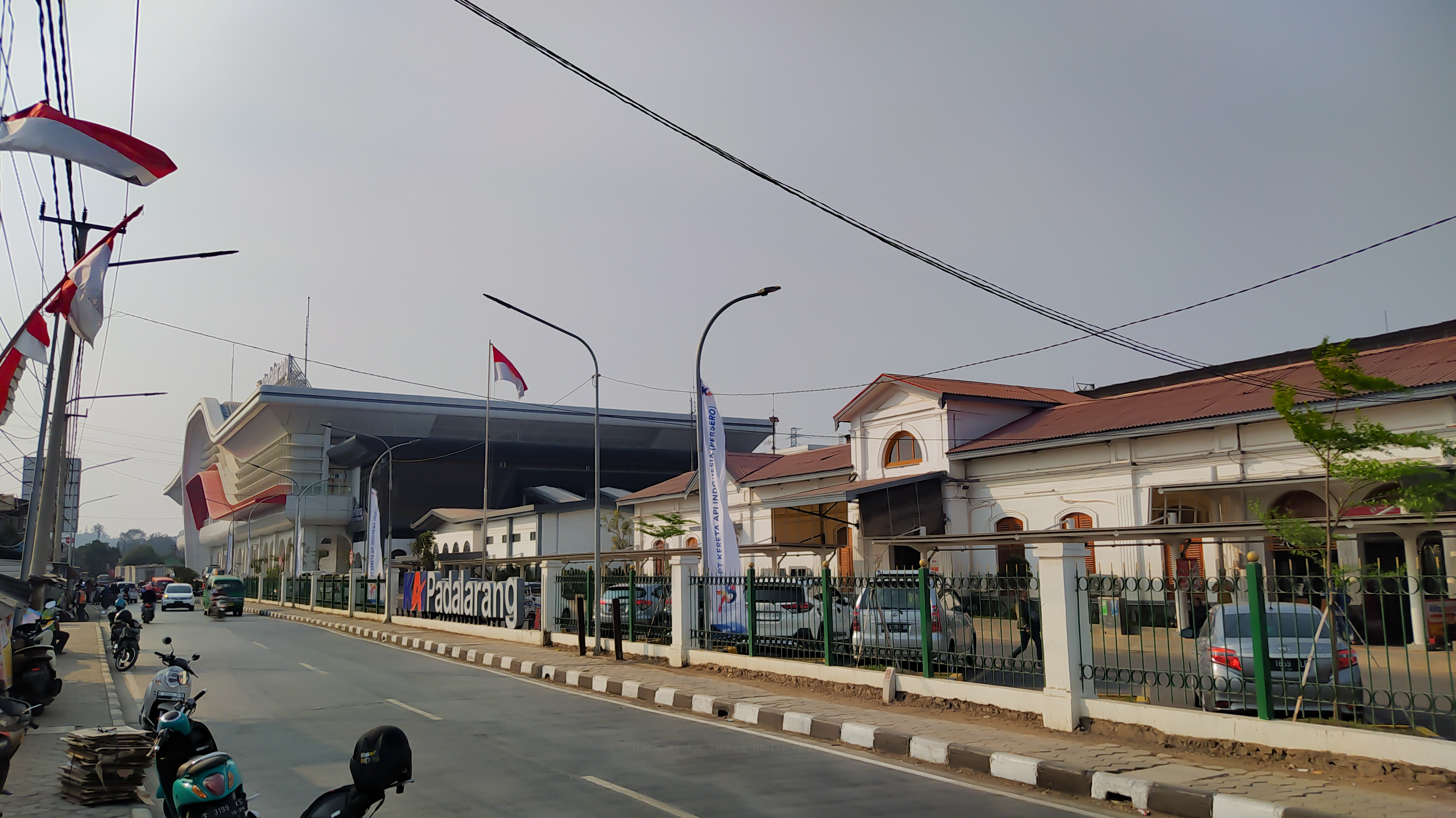
Padalarang station is a high-speed railway and local train station in West Java

Most cities and towns in West Java are served with narrow-gauge (mainly 1067mm) lines and connected to other provinces on Java Island. An example commuter rail in West Java which is Bandung Commuterline and KRL Commuterline electric suburban trains of Greater Jakarta covered the cities to Bogor and Cikarang, also Jabodebek LRT is a light rapid transit covered into Bekasi, Depok, and Bogor with Bekasi Line and Cibubur Line.

A high-speed railway, connecting Jakarta and Bandung, was opened in October 2023. Then Jakarta MRT Phase 3 with Balaraja to Cikarang, will be under construction in 2024.

=== Air ===
Bandung Husein Sastranegara International Airport serves direct domestic flights to Batam, Pekanbaru, Medan, Bandar Lampung, Surabaya, Yogyakarta, Denpasar, Semarang, Banjarmasin, Makassar, and also international services to/from Kuala Lumpur and Singapore. The Kertajati International Airport in Majalengka Regency is built to replace the Husein Sastranegara Airport and to ease air traffic at Soekarno–Hatta International Airport in Jakarta.

== Education ==
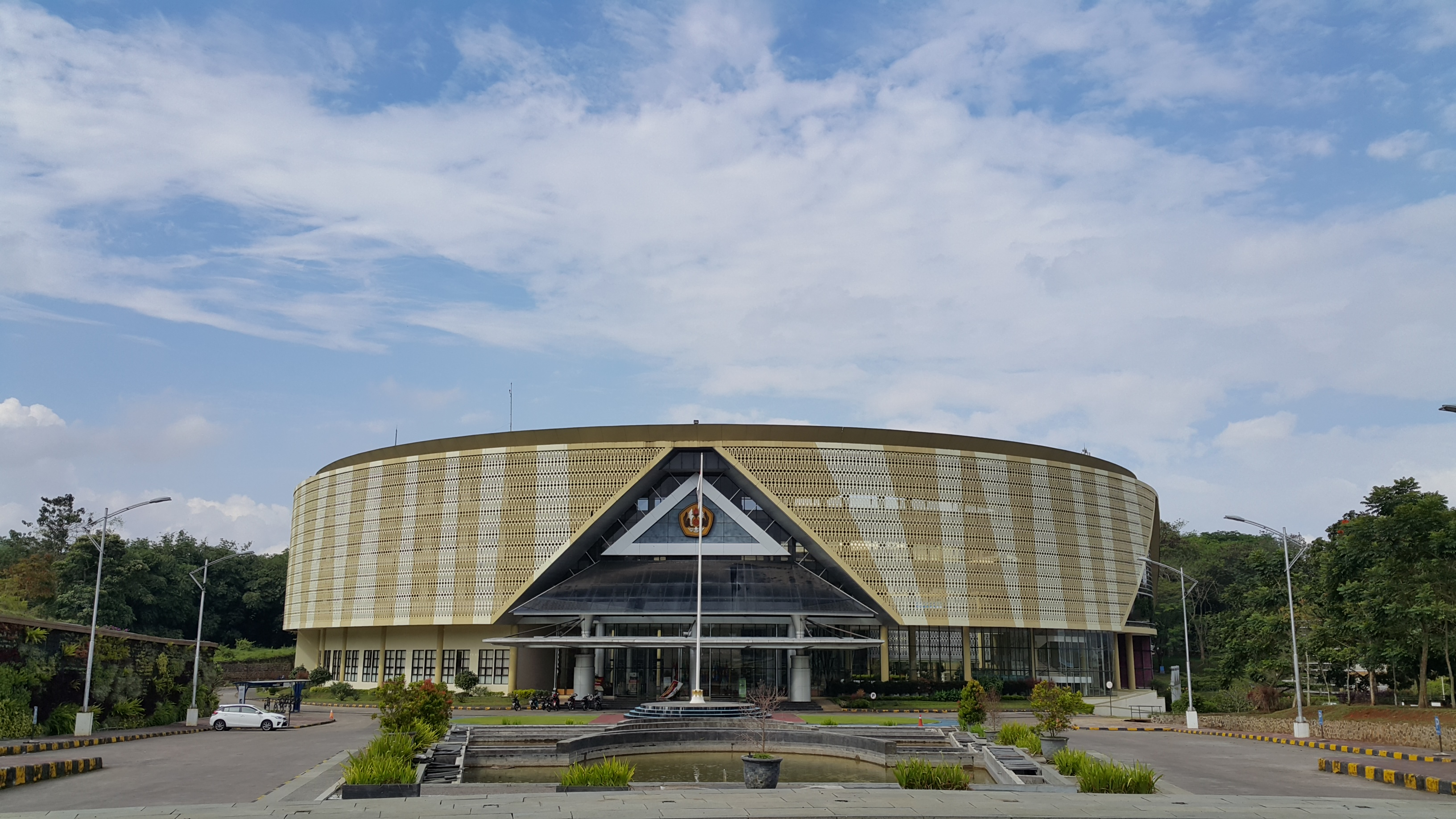
Padjadjaran University

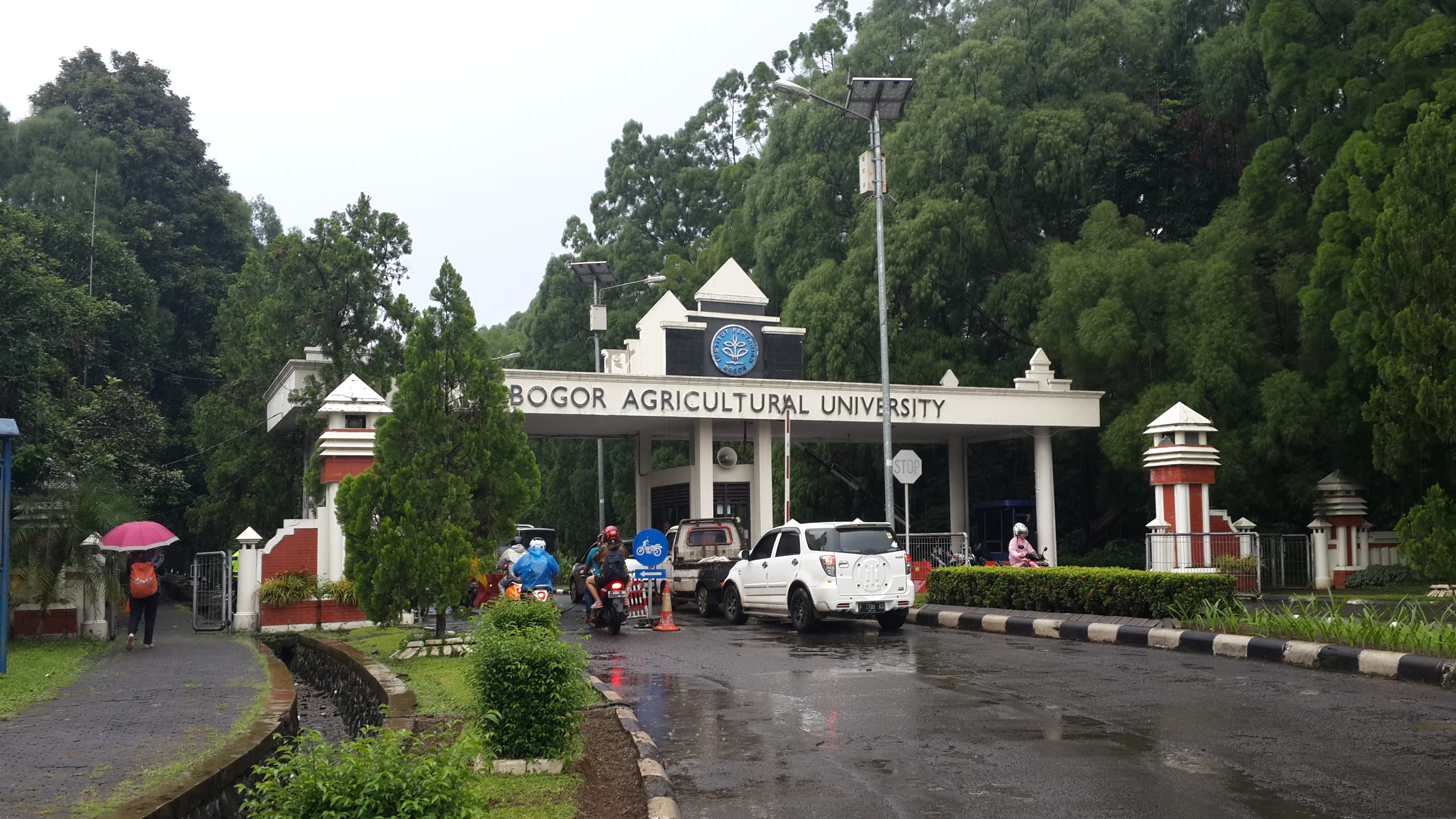
Bogor Agricultural University

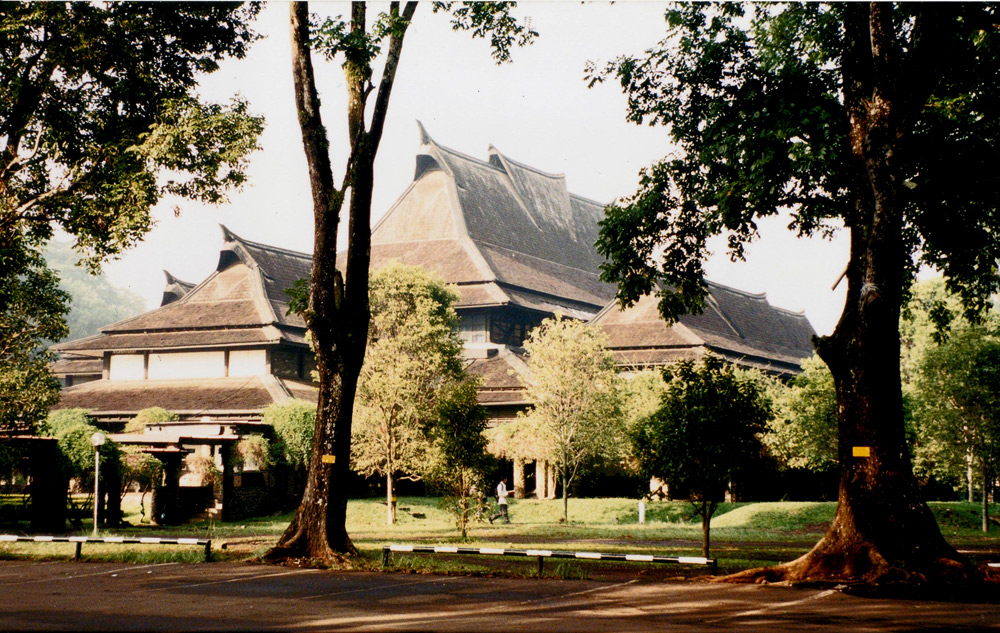
Bandung Institute of Technology

Major universities in West Java

West Java is one of the most popular destinations for higher education in Indonesia. It has many well-known universities joined by many students from the entire country. Some of which are:

- Bandung Institute of Technology
- Indonesia University of Education
- Padjadjaran University
- Bogor Agricultural University
- Parahyangan Catholic University
- UIN Sunan Gunung Djati
- Gunadarma University
- Telkom University
- President University

Another important form of education that is available in most cities in West Java is the Institut Pemerintahan Dalam Negeri (IPDN) located at Sumedang Regency and Sekolah Tinggi Intelijen Negara (STIN) located in Bogor.
