= List of colonial buildings in Bandung =

Colonial buildings in Bandung include those that were constructed during the Dutch colonial period of Indonesia. The period started with the founding of Bandung in the beginning of the 20th century, which is relatively young compared to other Indonesian cities. The list is divided into the colonial architectural styles: Traditionalism (before 20th century), Dutch Rationalism (1900s-1920s), and Modernism (1920s-1930s).This very general division into three stylistic influences can be refined to a greater differentiation. Architects were during the colonial periode first half of the 20th century more open to global stylistic influences as Beaux-arts, Art deco, Expressionism, etc., than their colleagues in the Netherlands.Indonesian researchers will benefit from the book "Indische Bouwkunst" . This lists more than 2000 projects built between 1900 and 1958 – many of which in Bandung- , as well as over 150 architects who designed them. This book has been translated into Bahasa Indonesia and is available as a free download.

Colonial architecture in Bandung is dominated with Modernist architecture, apparent in buildings such as civic buildings and offices. Bandung contains one of the largest remaining collections of Modernist building (Dutch Nieuwe Bouwen) in the world. European city planning based on garden city concept were implemented in the north part of Bandung, which is still apparent today in the architecture of the residences and villas. Most buildings in Bandung are designed by architects who lived and worked in Bandung, many of them were educated in The Netherlands. Some of the architecture were influenced with Indonesian architecture, and also North-American and British-Indies influences in the Modern architecture of pre-independent Indonesia.

Below is a list of colonial buildings found in Bandung. The list is sorted alphabetically according to its official (often, local) name. The list can also be sorted to each category.

Buildings which undertook complete renovation which resulted in different form are listed separately to distinguish the different architectural form.

== Traditionalism (before 20th century) ==
A small number of colonial buildings, mostly an original governmental function, were built in the 19th century in Neoclassical Indies Empire style (collectively known as Traditionalist movement) around the founding time of Bandung. Few early 19th-century buildings in the most developed tropical style of Indische stijl existed in Bandung, one of them is the residence of the assistant-residence, which was unfortunately demolished in 1926 for a new municipal office.

Indische Empire style continued to the early 20th century. Architect consultant 'Hulswit-Fermont, Batavia and Ed.Cuypers, Amsterdam' (Eduard Cuypers) introduced neoclassical language in the architecture of private banks. Characteristic for the architectural conception of this bank building is entrance portico with double columns crowned by composition capitals, a cornice and tympanum; the order of the facade-windows combined with columns and composition capitals.

Last official name	Former names	Year	Architect	Location	Latest image	Oldest image
Bank Mandiri - Bandung Asia Afrika (1998)	Nederlandsche Handel-Maatschappij te Bandoeng (original) / Bank Ekspor Impor (1960)	1912	Ed. Cuypers & Hulswit te Weltevreden	6°55′16″S 107°36′28″E		
Bank Negara Indonesia	Javasche Bank	1915	Hulswit-Fermont, Batavia and Ed. Cuypers, Amsterdam.	6°54′52″S 107°36′34″E		
Gedung Pakuan	Residentswoning	1860, 1941 restored	Gmelig Meijling (1941 restoration)	6°54′42″S 107°36′17″E		
Gemeentehuis (demolished in 1926, on its site is Balai Kota Bandung)	Huis van de assistent-resident, Assistent der Koffijkultuur	1819	for Andries de Wilde	6°54′39″S 107°36′35″E		
Grand Hotel Preanger (1920)	Inn (original); Hotel en Toko Thiem (1825); Hotel Preanger (1897)	1825	anonymous	6°55′15″S 107°36′42″E		
Hubdam III/Siliwangi	Middelbare Opleidingsschool voor Inlandsche Ambtenaren; Hogere Kweekschool (HKS); Hoofdenschool Bandoeng (1878); Sakola Menak	29 December 1878		6°56′04″S 107°36′27″E		
Kantoor van J.R. de Vries en Co. (demolished, now Toko de Vries)	Kantoor van J.R. de Vries en Co.	19th-century		6°55′18″S 107°36′35″E		
Kantoor van De Vries en Fabricius (demolished, now Toko de Vries)	Kantoor van De Vries en Fabricius	19th-century		6°55′18″S 107°36′35″E		
Mako II Kodam III Siliwangi, Gedung Sabahu	Departement van Oorlog	1910-1915		6°54′40″S 107°36′52″E		
Polwiltabes	Hollandsch Inlandsche Kweekschool	1866 (opened)	anonymous	6°54′50″S 107°36′39″E		
Residentiekantoor (demolished, now Gedung Keuangan Negara Bandung)	Residentiekantoor	1867	anonymous	6°55′19″S 107°36′40″E		
Rumah Sakit Immanuel	Zendinghospitaal Immanuel			6°56′09″S 107°35′46″E		
Sociëteit Concordia (demolished, now the Museum Konperensi Asia Afrika)	Sociëteit Concordia	1895		6°55′16″S 107°36′35″E		

== Dutch Rationalism (1900s – 1920s) ==
The early 20th century was characterized by the introduction of new technological method of construction. The period saw the effect of a new beginning when the colony is exposed to private initiatives and enormous population growth. Many new private houses were built during this time all over Indonesia. The preferable architecture style were eclectic, sometimes Romantic, combination of Dutch and Javanese style.

A new style, known as Dutch Rationalism, flourished in the Netherlands as well as in the Indies; the subsequent style in the tropical climate of Indonesia is known as New Indies Style. It is largely introduced by Moojen from Batavia, who was largely influenced by the works of Berlage. The style is the result of the attempt to develop new solutions to integrate traditional precedents (classicism) with new technological possibilities. It can be described as a transitional style between Traditionalists and the Modernists.

Last official name	Former names	Year	Architect	Location	Latest image	Oldest image
Nederlandsch Indische Handelsbank (demolished, now Mandiri no. 92)	Nederlandsch Indische Handelsbank	1911	Moojen.	6°55′18″S 107°36′32″E		
Telefoonkantoor (demolished, now Plasa Telkom Lembong)	Telefoonkantoor	1908	Ch. Meyll Burgerlijke Openbare Werken.	6°55′00″S 107°36′39″E		
Toko De Vries	Warenhuis De Vries	1912	Hulswit-Fermont, Batavia and Ed.Cuypers, Amsterdam.	6°55′18″S 107°36′35″E		

== Modernism (1920s-1930s) ==
The period saw the emergence of Modernism and its varieties, namely Art Deco, Nieuwe Bouwen, Amsterdam School and other variations. The same period, in 1929, Bandung approved the 'Framework plan' city planning, which covered an area of 12,758 ha, divided in plans for mainly the Northern- and partly the Southern areas of the town. This fosters the development of early 20th-century modern architecture in Bandung.

Art Deco evolved from earlier Dutch Rationalism. The form is symmetrical and exudes technological progress and glamour, with rich color and bold geometric shapes. In Bandung, Art Deco often manifested in the decorative element in the street facades, often hiding an ordinary building with a helm roof and covered with tiles; these architecture is mostly the product of rebuilding and upgrading of commercial buildings in the 1920s and 1930s.

In the following period between late 1930s and 1940s, Art Deco evolved into a new style known as Nieuwe Bouwen (Dutch term for Modernism) or Functionalism. Instead of creating decorative style on the facade, the architect creates style in the clear arrangement of space. The preference is to use universal form such as cylinder or curving horizontal lines. Nowhere else in Indonesia are the influences of the 'Modern movement' in architecture observable as in the City of Bandung. Albert Aalbers is the most representative expression of Nieuwe Bouwen in Indonesia, and many of his masterpieces - such as Savoy Homann Hotel (1939), Denis Bank (1936), and the "Driekleur" (1937) - were located in Bandung. The style is characterized by its openness, its sleek facade lines, and strong spatial effect on the exterior. Bandung contains one of the largest remaining collections of Art Deco-Nieuwe Bouwen buildings in the world.

Also included in this period are those architects who implemented the principles of native art of building in Indonesia, such as those designed by Henri Maclaine Pont.

Last official name	Former names	Year	Architect	Location	Latest image	Oldest image
	Nederlands-Indische Metaalwaren Emballage Fabrieken					
	Keramisch Laboratorium Afdeling Nijverheid					
	De Indische Centrale Aanschaffingsdienst					
	IJkwezen Bandoeng					
	Jubileum Park					
	Molukken Park					
	Zweminrichting 'het Centrum'	1927	C.P. Wolff Schoemaker			
3 Villas in Jalan Dago (Ir. H. Juanda)	Drie Locomotives	1936	Albert Aalbers			
Asuransi Jiwasraya	Nillmij		Snuyf en Wiemans	6°55′15″S 107°36′25″E		
Bala Keselamatan	Het Leger des Heils	1920	Brinkman en Voorhoeve	6°54′55″S 107°36′49″E		
Balai Kota Bandung	Raadhuis Gem. Secretarie en Technische Diensten	1927, 1935 (expanded)	E.H. de Roo.	6°54′39″S 107°36′35″E		
Bandung Promotion Center	De Zon	1925	anonymous	6°55′15″S 107°36′20″E		
Bandung railway station (2nd building)	Station Bandoeng	1928	F. Cousin (Bouwkundig Bureau van de Staatsspoorwegen)	6°54′53″S 107°36′09″E		
Bank BJB	DENIS De Eerste Nederlandsch – Indische Spaarkas, Bank Karya Pembangunan	1935-1936	Albert Aalbers	6°55′12″S 107°36′37″E		
Bank BJB Syariah	Residentiekantoor Afd. Priangan, 's Landskas, Algemeen Ontvanger en Landsvendukantoor Bandoeng; N.V. Oliefabrieken Insulinde (original)	1918-1921	Richard Leonard Arnold Schoemaker	6°54′53″S 107°36′31″E		
Bank Mandiri (1998)	Nederlandsch Indische Escompto Maatschappij / Bank Dagang Negara (1960)	1912	Moojen.	6°55′15″S 107°36′24″E		
Bank Pacific (abandoned)	Internationale Crediet- en Handelsverg. Rotterdam.; Bank Pacific	1925		6°55′16″S 107°36′44″E		
Bio Farma	Instituut Pasteur	1919	A. Thedens Burgerlijke Openbare Werken.	6°53′58″S 107°36′02″E		
Bioscoop Dian (abandoned)	Radio City	1925		6°55′22″S 107°36′27″E		
Bioscoop Elita	Bioscoop Elita	1930	F.W. Brinkman T. Voorhoeve			
Bioscoop Oriental	Bioscoop Oriëntal	1930	F.W. Brinkman T. Voorhoeve			
Bioscoop Orion	Bioscoop Orion					
Direktorat Keuangan Angkatan Darat	Militaire Sociëteit			6°54′43″S 107°37′13″E		
Gedung Kologdam	Bandung Jaarbeurs	1919	C.P. Wolff Schoemaker	6°54′35″S 107°37′01″E		
Gedung Landmark Braga	Boekhandel en Drukkerij G.C.T. van Dorp & Co	1921	C.P. Wolff Schoemaker	6°54′56″S 107°36′31″E		
Gedung Merdeka	Club Concordia	1921	C.P. Wolff Schoemaker	6°55′16″S 107°36′33″E		
Gedung Moh. Toha	Machinehal, Jaarbeurs	1919	C.P. Wolff Schoemaker	6°54′37″S 107°37′02″E		
Gedung Sate	Deparetment van Gouvernementsbedrijven te Bandoeng	1920	J. Gerber (Landsgebouwendienst)	6°54′09″S 107°37′08″E		
Gereja Injili Indonesia Hok Im Tong, "Indonesian Evangelical Church"	Kerk van de Christian Science Society			6°53′55″S 107°36′42″E		
Gereja Katedral Santo Petrus	Katholieke kerk Bandoeng	1922	C.P. Wolff Schoemaker	6°54′53″S 107°36′38″E		
Gereja Kristen Indonesia Taman Cibunut	Gereformeerde Kerk	23 December 1920 (opened)	6°55′01″S 107°36′55″E			
GPIB Bethel, Bethel Protestant Church	Protestantsche Kerk (Pieterskerk), Bethelkerk, de Nieuwe Kerk	1924-1925	C.P. Wolff Schoemaker	6°54′49″S 107°36′31″E		
GPIB Maranatha, Maranatha Protestant Church	Oosterkerk	1926	F. W. Brinkman	6°54′25″S 107°37′35″E		
Grand Hotel Preanger		1925	C.P. Wolff Schoemaker	6°55′15″S 107°36′42″E		
Institut Teknologi Bandung	Technische Hogeschool te Bandoeng	1920	Henri Maclaine Pont	6°53′33″S 107°36′38″E		
Kantor Pos Besar Bandung	Post- en Telegraafkantoor	1928-1931	J. van Gendt (Landsgebouwendienst)	6°55′14″S 107°36′22″E		
Kantor Pusat Pos Indonesia & Museum Pos Indonesia, Headquarter of Pos Indonesia and museum.	Post-, Telegraaf- en Telefoondienst	27 Juli 1920-1931	J. Berger (Landsgebouwendienst)	6°54′08″S 107°37′11″E		
Kodam III Siliwangi	Het Paleis van de Legercommandant	1918	Richard Leonard Arnold Schoemaker	6°54′35″S 107°36′49″E		
Lapas Sukamiskin				6°54′22″S 107°40′32″E		
Museum Geologi	Geologisch Laboratorium	1928	H. Menalda van Schouwenburg	6°54′03″S 107°37′17″E		
Museum Konperensi Asia Afrika		1926	Van Galen, C.P. Wolff Schoemaker	6°55′16″S 107°36′35″E		
Museum Mandala Wangsit Siliwangi	House of H. ter Poorten (Major General, Inspector of Artillery)	around 1910		6°55′04″S 107°36′41″E		
New Majestic	Bioscoop Concordia (1924); Majestic Theatre (1973); Bioskop Dewi (1960)	1924	C.P. Wolff Schoemaker	6°55′15″S 107°36′35″E		
Pasar Baroe (demolished, on its site stands Pasar Baru Trade Center)	Pasar Baroe			6°55′03″S 107°36′14″E		
PD Bandung Baru	Wijs vendukantoor	1910-1920	anonymous	6°55′09″S 107°36′23″E		
Perkebunan XII	Preanger Administratie Incasso Kantoor (PAIK)	1937				
Perum Listrik Negara - Distribusi Jawa Barat dan Banten	Gemeenschappelijk Electriciteitsbedrijf Bandoeng en Omstreken (GEBEO)	1922	Richard Leonard Arnold Schoemaker	6°55′16″S 107°36′30″E		
PN Gas	Ned.- Ind. Gas. Mij., Showroom en kantoor; Becker en Co (original)	1919	C.P. Schoemaker & Associatie	6°55′06″S 107°36′35″E		
Rumah Potong Hewan (slaughterhouse)	Gemeentelijk Slachthuis te Bandoeng	1935	G. Hendriks, E.H. de Roo	6°54′44″S 107°35′20″E		
Santa Angela school	Hogereburgerschool der Zusters Ursulinen	1921	Eduard Cuypers Hulswit-Fermont.	6°54′46″S 107°36′39″E		
Savoy Homann Bidakara Hotel	Savoy Homann Hotel	1939	Albert Aalbers	6°55′20″S 107°36′37″E		
SMK Negeri 15 Bandung (1997-now)	I.E.V. Kweekschool; Gabungan Indo Unit Kesatuan Indonesia (1952); SGA Negeri II Bandung (1953); SGA Negeri I Bandung (1978); SGO Negeri Bandung (1983); SMPS Negeri Bandung (1989)	1919		6°55′23″S 107°37′07″E		
SMA, SMP Santo Aloysius	R.K. Muloschool; Japanese-run internment camp			6°54′18″S 107°36′44″E		
SMA Negeri 3 & 5 Bandung	Hogereburgerschool Bandoeng; Kompetai	1920	J. van Hoytema Burgerlijke Openbare Werken.	6°54′44″S 107°36′55″E		
SMAK Dago, "Dago Christian High School" (now demolished in 2012)	SMAK Dago and SMA1 State High School (1945); Christelijk Lyceum Dago (1927); Residence of Tan (original)	1910	R.L.A. Schoemaker (1919, Villa), J.S. Duyvis (1939 renovation) , A.W. Gmelig Meijling (1941 renovation)	6°53′46″S 107°36′45″E		
SMP Negeri 2 Bandung	Europese Lagere School	1913		6°54′50″S 107°36′51″E		
SMP Negeri 5 Bandung	MULO Bandoeng	1920		6°54′52″S 107°36′52″E		
Villa Isola	Villa Isola	1933	C.P. Wolff Schoemaker	6°51′40″S 107°35′38″E		
Villa Tiga Warna	Driekleur	1937	Albert Aalbers	6°54′19″S 107°36′39″E		
Waskita Karya	Aannemings Volker Maatschappij NV			6°55′15″S 107°36′26″E		
Wisma van Deventer (SMK BPP)	Van Deventerschool (1919); Normaalschool voor meisjes (1921)	1919	R.A.L. Schoemaker	6°55′04″S 107°36′59″E		

== See also ==
- List of tallest buildings in Bandung
- List of churches in Indonesia
- List of colonial buildings and structures in Jakarta
- New Indies Style
- Tropical Modernity, C.J. van Dullemen, SUN, 2010
- Arsitektur Modernitas Tropis, C.J. van Dullemen, Comunitas Bambu, 2018

== Cited works ==
- Akihary, Huib (1990). Architectuur & Stedebouw in Indonesië 1870/1970. Zutphen: De Walburg Pers. ISBN 9072691024.
- Norbruis, Obbe (2020). Landmarks from a bygone era, Life and work of Ed. Cuypers & Hulswit-Fermont 1897-1927. Volendam: LM Publishers. ISBN 9789460220128.
- Norbruis, Obbe (2020). Architecture from the Indonesian Past, Life and work of Fermont-Cuypers 1927-1957. Volendam: LM Publishers. ISBN 9789460220159.
- Norbruis, Obbe (2021). Indische Bouwkunst, architecten en hun oeuvre in Nederlands-Indië en Indonesië in de eerste helft van de 20ste eeuw. Volendam: LM Publishers. ISBN 9789460220296.
- Norbruis, Obbe (2022). Arsitektur di Nusantara. Para Arsitek dan Karya Mereka di Hindia-Belanda dan Indonesia pada Paruh Pertama Abad ke-20. Download free www.heritage-hands-on.org/projects.
