= Bandung Geological Museum =

Museum in Bandung, Indonesia

Coordinates: 6.9007°S 107.6215°E

- Museum Geologi Bandung
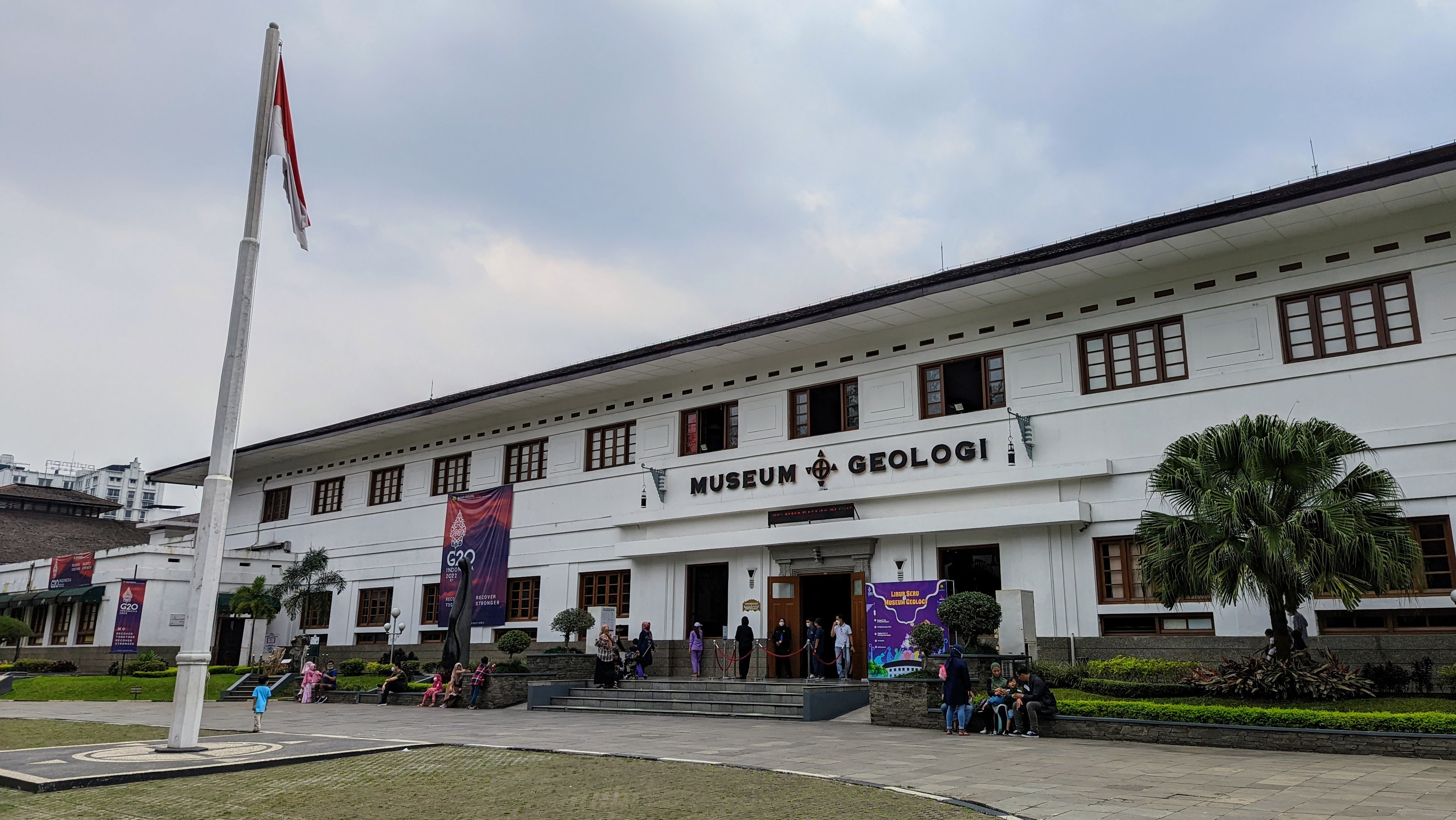
- Established: May 16, 1929
- Location: Bandung, Indonesia
- Website: https://museum.geologi.esdm.go.id/

Bandung Geological Museum is a Museum in Bandung, Indonesia. The Museum was built in 1928 and inaugurated with the name "Geologische Museum" on 16 May, 1929. In 1998, the museum was renovated with funding from Japan International Cooperation Agency. After the renovation was completed, the Museum was reopened and inaugurated by the Vice President of Indonesia, Megawati Soekarnoputri on August 23, 2000.

== See also ==
- List of museums and cultural institutions in Indonesia
- List of colonial buildings in Bandung

== Gallery ==
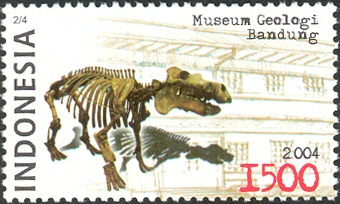
Stamp

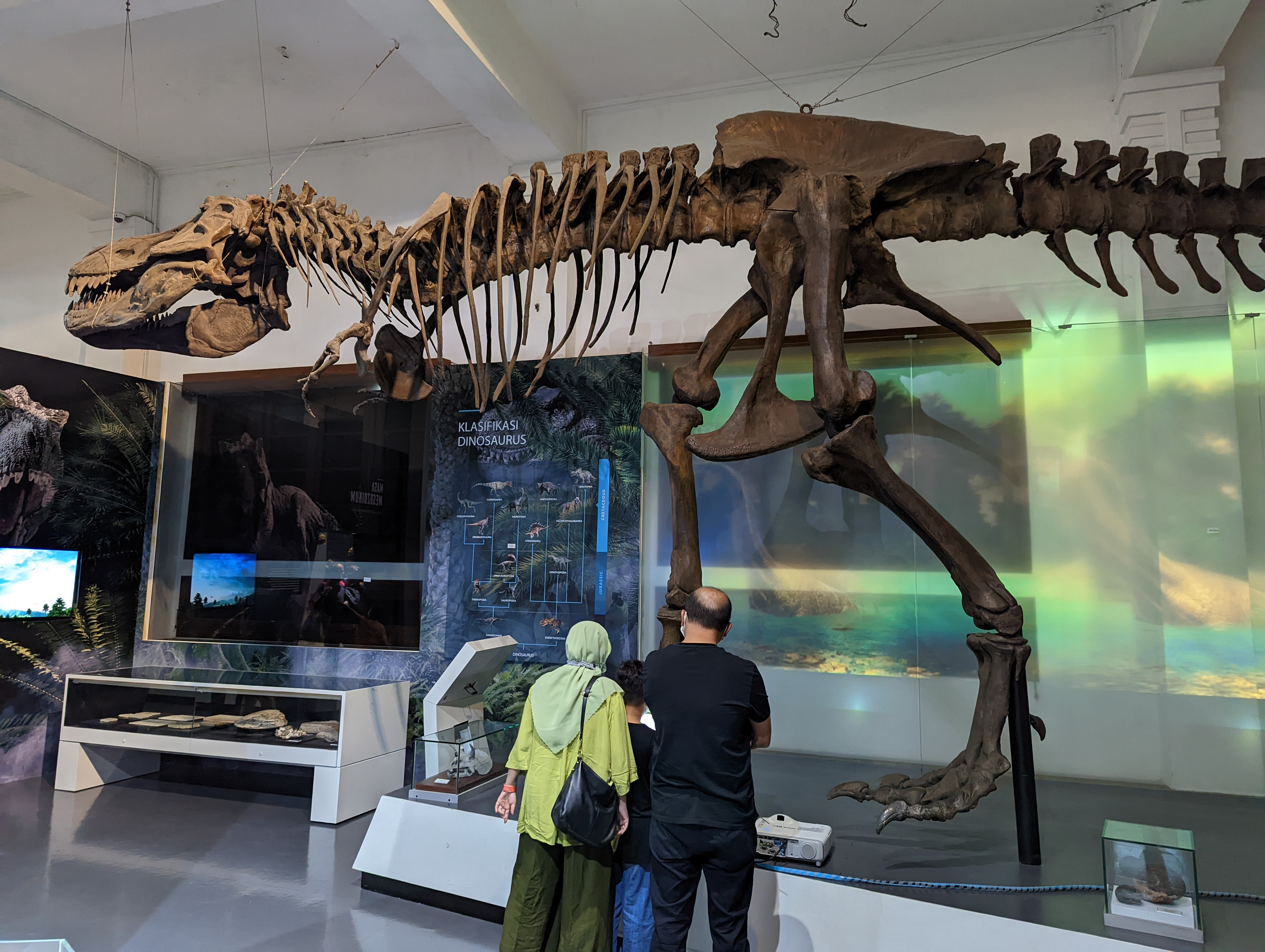

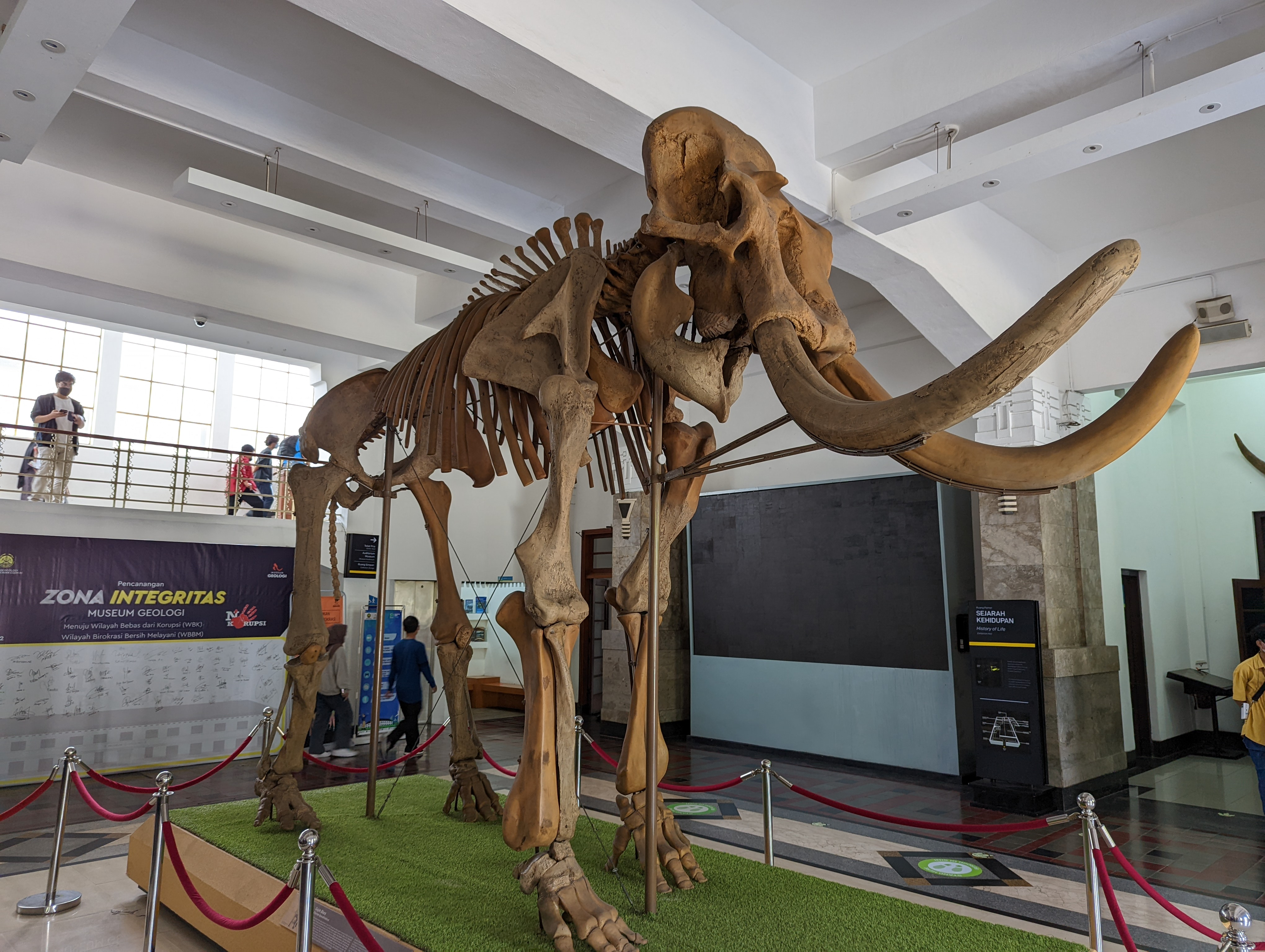

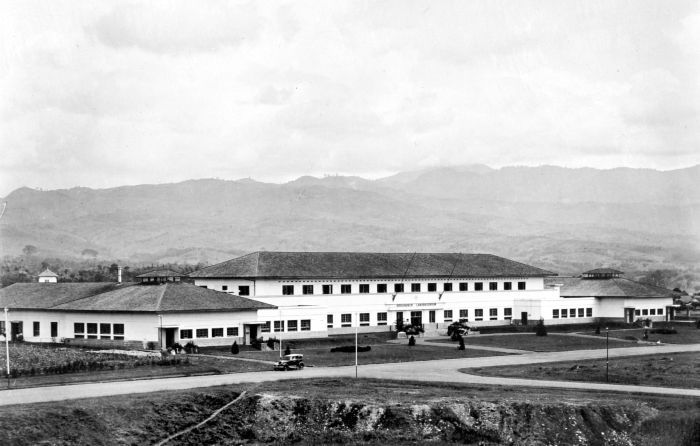

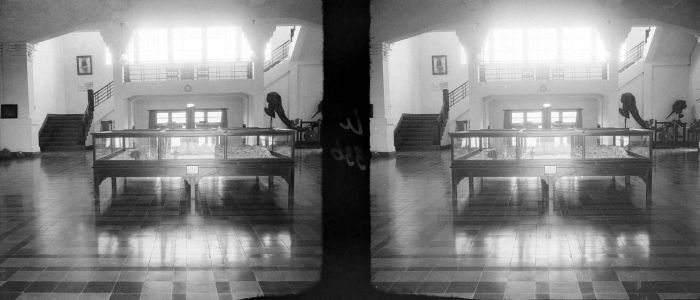
Hall

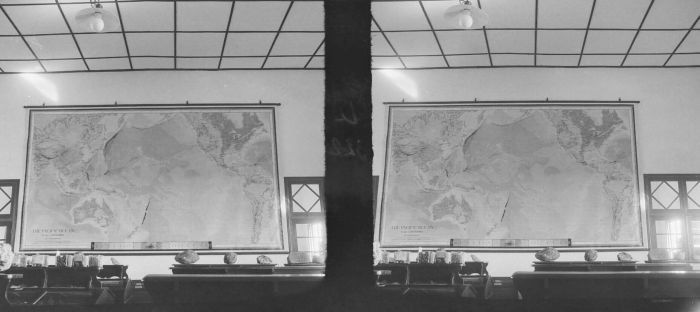
Map (1929)

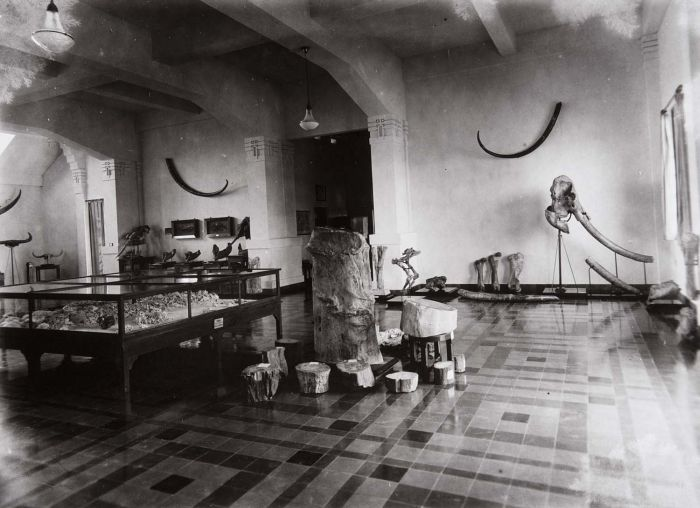

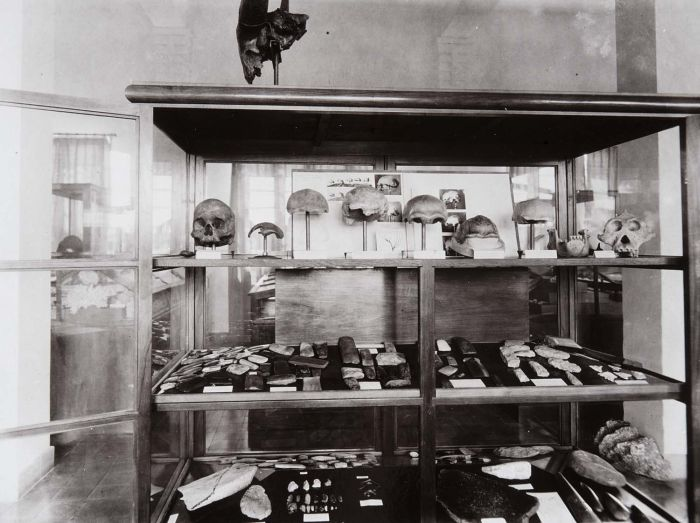
