= Merdeka Building =

Building in Bandung

Coordinates: 6.92114°S 107.60922°E

- Gedung Merdeka
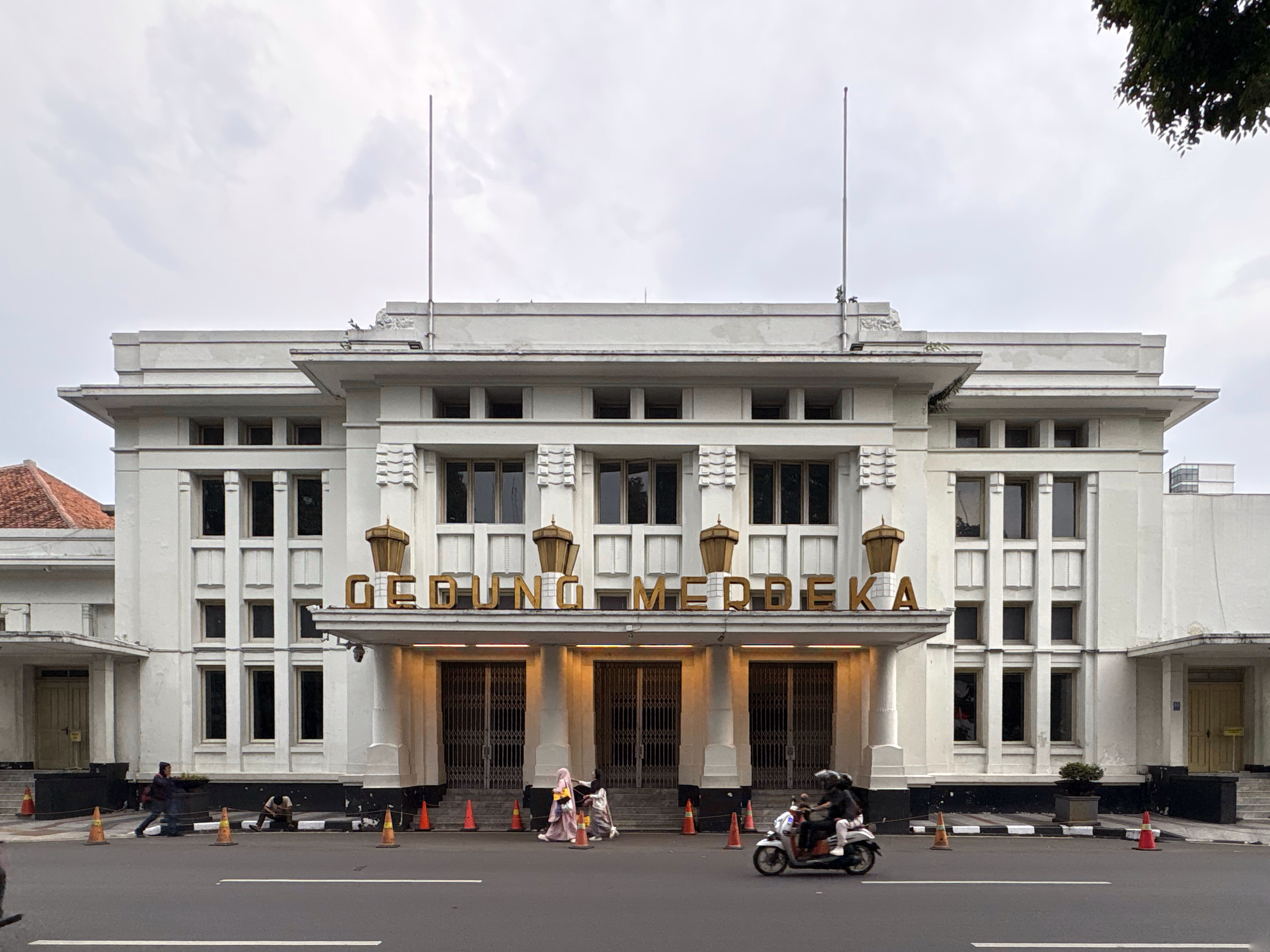
- Merdeka building in 2025
- Interactive map of the Merdeka Building area

General information
- Architectural style: Art Deco
- Location: Bandung, West Java
- Construction started: 1895

Technical details
- Grounds: 7500 m²

Merdeka Building (Indonesian: Gedung Merdeka) is an Art Deco building in Jalan Asia-Afrika, Bandung, Indonesia. Today it serves as a museum displaying collections and photographs of the Asian–African Conference, the first Non-Aligned Movement event, which was held there in 1955.

== Architecture ==
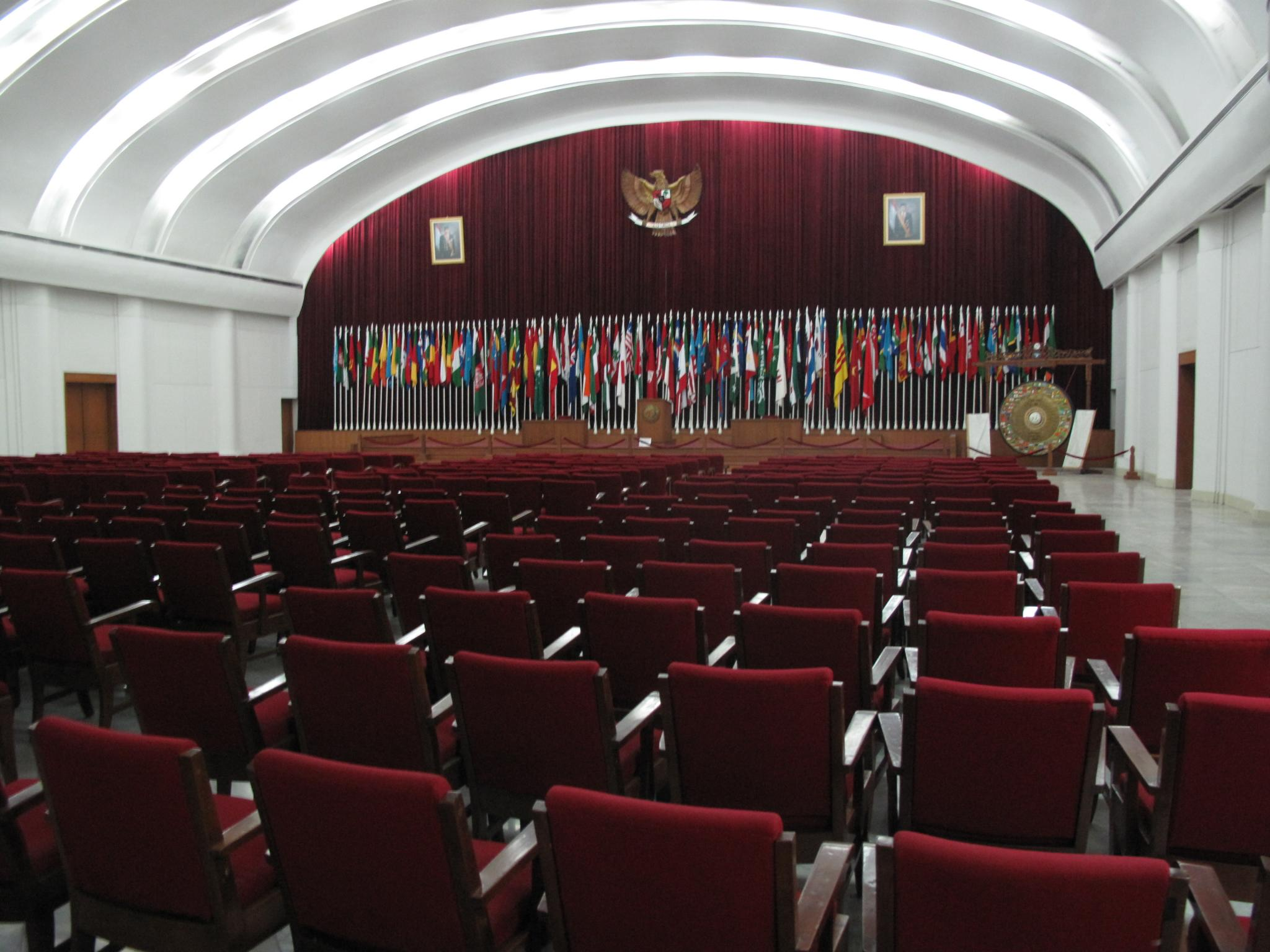
Conference hall in Gedung Merdeka in 2010.

The present building was designed in 1926 in Art Deco style by Van Galen and C.P. Wolff Schoemaker, both professors at Technische Hogeschool (today ITB) and famous architects of that time; a further extension was designed in 1940 in Streamline Moderne style by Albert Aalbers. The 7500 m² building had Italian marble floors, some saloon and rooms in cikenhout wooden finishing, and was adorned with crystal lamps on the ceilings.

== History ==
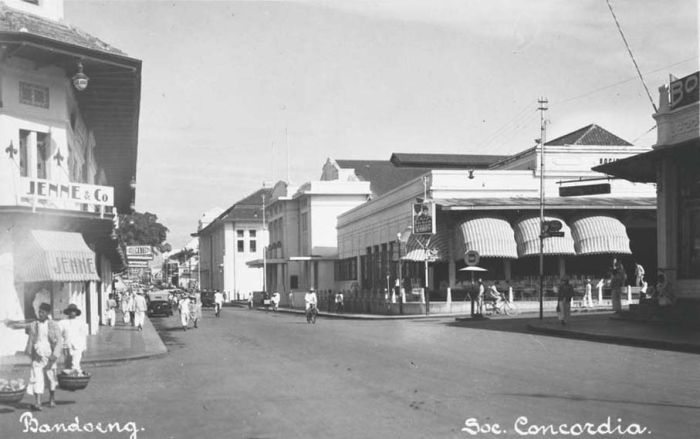
The 19th century Sociëteit Concordia before its rebuilt in 1926.

The first building on the site at the intersection of Braga Street and Jalan Asia-Africa was constructed in 1895 for the Sociëteit Concordia. In 1926 it was rebuilt by Wolff Schoemacher, Albert Aalbers and Van Gallen. The Sociëteit Concordia was the dance hall, entertainment and social gathering venue for rich people in Bandung and its vicinity. That included plantation owners or employees, officers, officials, and wealthy businessman. During weekends, the building was filled with people enjoying art performances, social dances and dinner.

During the Japanese occupation of the Dutch East Indies, the building was renamed Dai Toa Kaikan and served as cultural centre.

After the Indonesian proclamation of Independence on 17 August 1945, the building was used as headquarters of Indonesian independence fighters against Japanese troops.

After the recognition of Indonesian Independence by The Netherlands in 1949, and the formation of federal government of Negara Pasundan, Concordia building was once again used as public gathering hall, for art performances, parties, dances, and gala dinner.

In 1954, the government of Indonesia appointed Bandung as the host of Asian–African Conference, the Concordia building chosen as the venue of this International conference. At that time Concordia was the largest and grandest hall in Bandung, with strategic location near Savoy Homann Hotel and Preanger Hotel in the city centre. In early 1955, the building was renovated to meet international conference requirements by Ir. R. Srigati Santoso, and renamed Gedung Merdeka (independence building). The building also served as Indonesian House of Representatives (DPR) convention building.

In 1965 the Gedung Merdeka was the venue for the Asian-African Islamic Conference. In 1971 all of the House of Representatives meetings and activities were moved to Jakarta. In March 1980 the building hosted the 25th anniversary of the Asian-African Conference, and the Asian-African Conference Museum was inaugurated by president Soeharto.
