= Charles Prosper Wolff Schoemaker =

Dutch painter

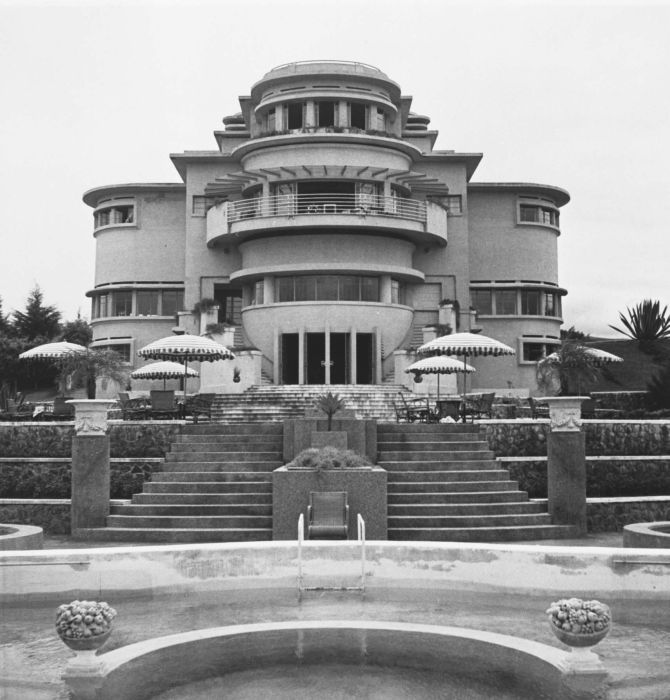
The Villa Isola in Bandung, designed by Wolff Schoemaker

Charles Prosper Wolff Schoemaker (25 July 1882 – 22 May 1949) was a Dutch architect who designed several distinguished Art Deco buildings in Bandung, Indonesia, including the Villa Isola and Hotel Preanger. He has been described as "the Frank Lloyd Wright of Indonesia," and Wright had a considerable influence on Wolff Schoemaker's modernist designs. Although he was primarily known as an architect, he was also a painter and sculptor.

== Early life and formative years ==
Wolff Schoemaker was born in Banyubiru, Semarang, on the island of Java, Indonesia where he would spend most of his life. For his secondary school education, Wolff Schoemaker was sent to the KMA (Royal Military Academy) in the Dutch city of Breda.

In 1905, he returned to the Dutch East Indies to work for the Royal Dutch East Indies Army as a military engineer. After leaving the job in 1911, he became the engineer for the Department of Civil Public Works in Batavia (present-day Jakarta), and became the Director of Public Works in 1914. From 1917 to 1918, he worked for Fa. Schlieper & Co and took a study trip to the United States with the organization, where he came into contact with the work of Frank Lloyd Wright.

== Career ==
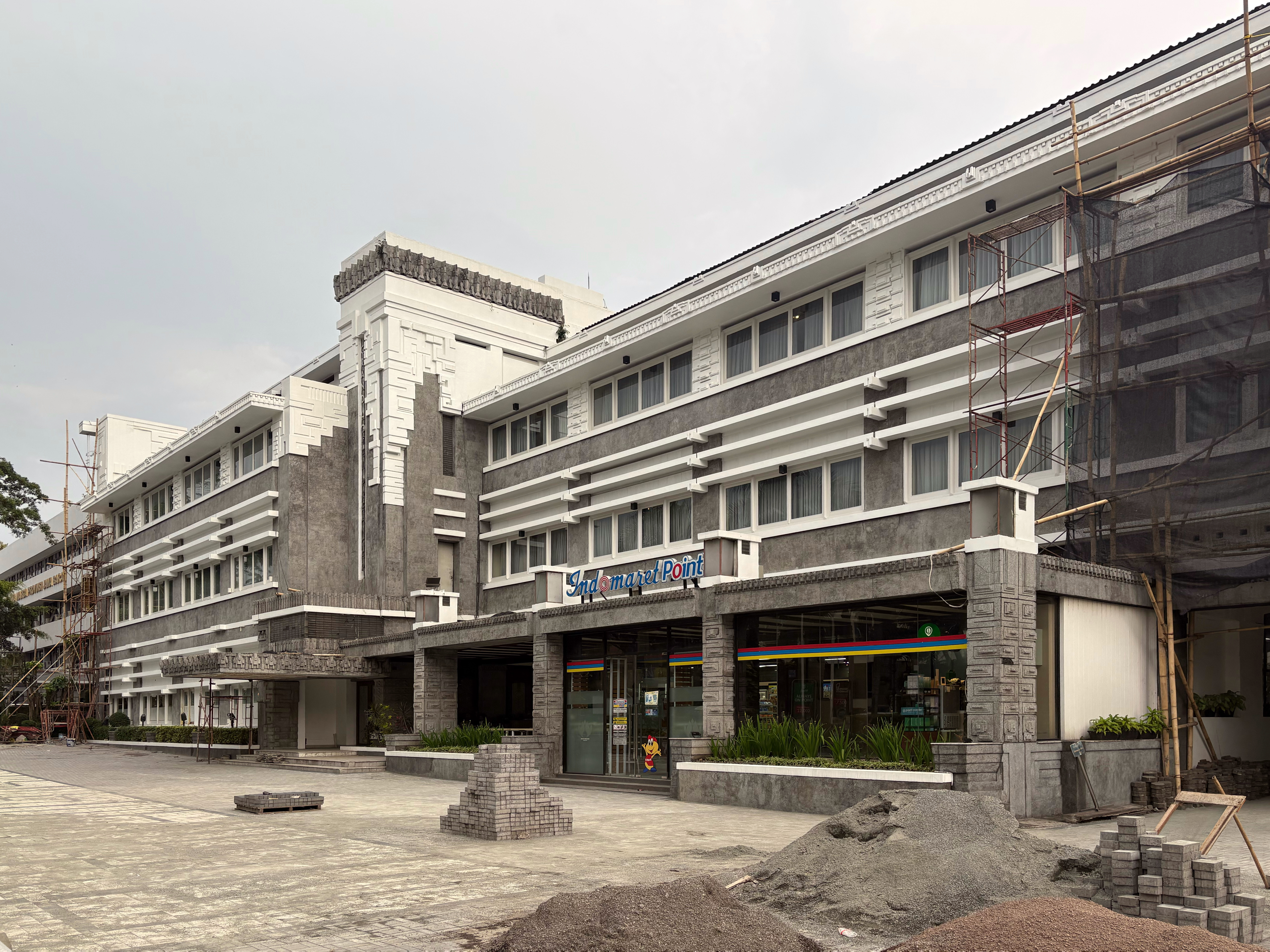
Hotel Preanger in Bandung

In 1918, in partnership with his brother Richard, Wolff Schoemaker established the architectural firm C.P. Schoemaker and Associates in Bandung. His firm blended traditional Indonesian architecture with modern European styles, incorporating traditional elements into the shapes and layouts of the buildings. Wolff Schoemaker deliberately applied a functionalist approach to his buildings. Among his most notable buildings were the Sociëteit Concordia building on Braga Street (1921), where the Asian–African Conference was held in 1955 (today known as Gedung Merdeka), the Hotel Preanger (1929), the Pasteur Institute of Indonesia, the St. Peter Cathedral, and Villa Isola (1932), all located in Bandung.

His own house, built between 1920-1925 in a northern residential neighbourhood of Bandung, specifically in the Sawunggaling street in Dago area, epitomized his architectural vision. The building had been under threat of being demolished in 1995, only rescued after the intervention of the Bandung Society for Heritage Conservation. The adaptive reuse of the building, then converted into a bank in 1990 and has been in use as a café since late 2010s onwards, was carried out in 1996 with the help of local architects and students. The conservation of this local heritage has been awarded one of the UNESCO Asia-Pacific Heritage Awards for Culture Heritage Conservation in 2000.

In 1922, he became the professor of the Technische Hoogeschool Bandoeng (Institut Teknologi Bandung/ITB). While professor, he mentored Sukarno, who would become the first President of the Republic of Indonesia. With assistance from the young Sukarno, Wolff Schoemaker renovated the Hotel Preanger in 1929. Under Wolff Schoemaker's assistance, Sukarno also designed several houses in Bandung. One of Wolff Schoemaker's most significant works was the Villa Isola, built from 1932 to 1933 for the Dutch media tycoon Dominique William Berretty. Wolff Schoemaker's design was influenced by indigenous Javanese philosophy; the orientation of the building is according to the north–south axis, where the building faces Mount Tangkuban Perahu to the north and the city of Bandung to the south. The building incorporates many circular shapes, such as a spiral staircase in the main lobby and an arch-shaped window in the family room. Wolff Schoemaker traveled to the Netherlands in 1939, where he took a post at the Delft University of Technology until his retirement in 1941. Wolff Schoemaker died in Bandung in 1949 and was buried in the Dutch War Cemetery Pandu.

== Legacy ==
Wolff Schoemaker was considered one of the best Indonesian architects of his time. Throughout his career, he explored the relationship between European designs and Indonesian vernacular expression. His work developed a new modern language of forms based on tropical conditions and principles.

== Works ==
In the book ‘Indische Bouwkunst’ more than fifty buildings designed by Wolff Schoemaker are mentioned. This book has been translated into Bahasa Indonesia and is available as a free download.

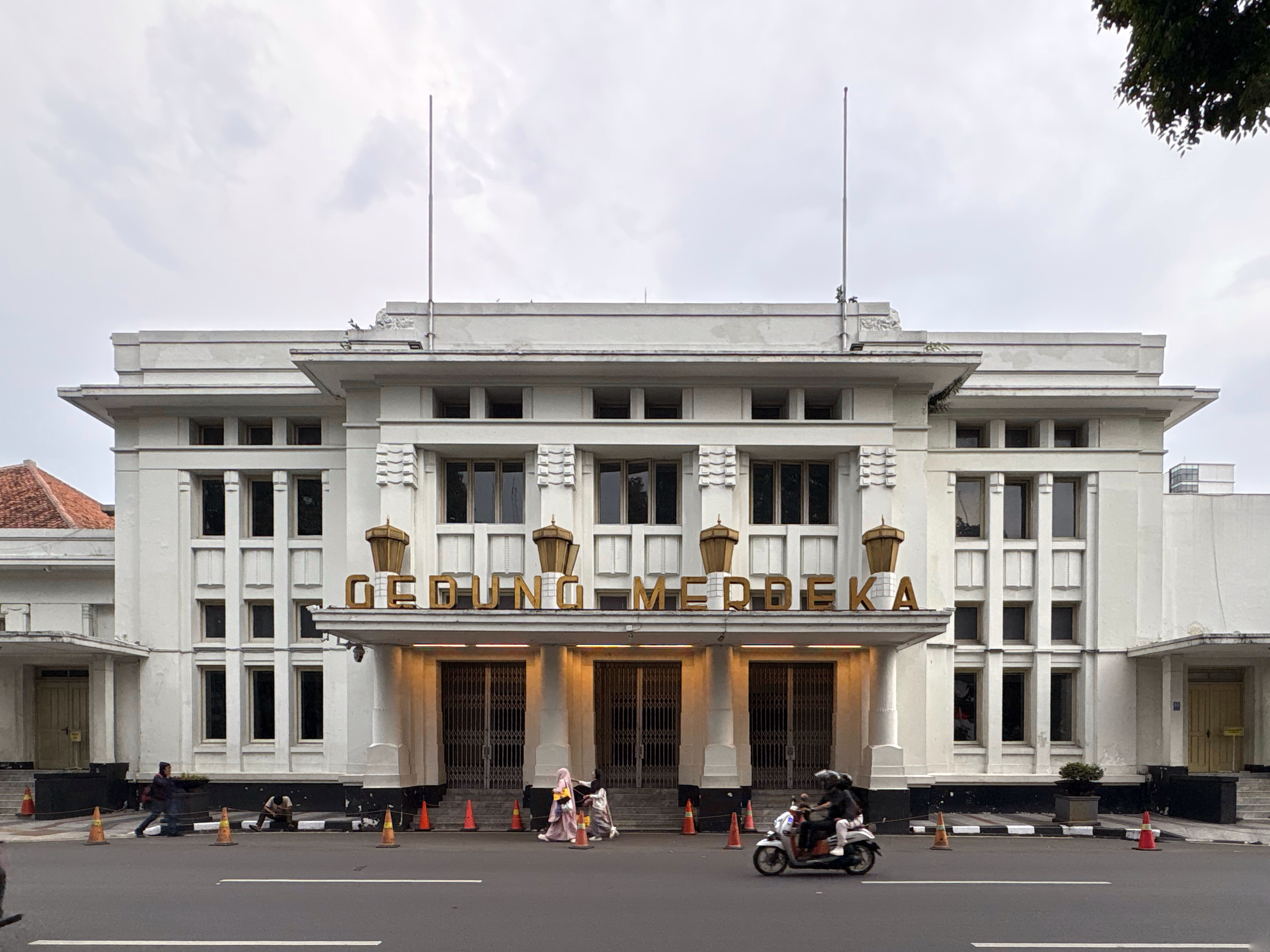
Gedung Merdeka, Bandung

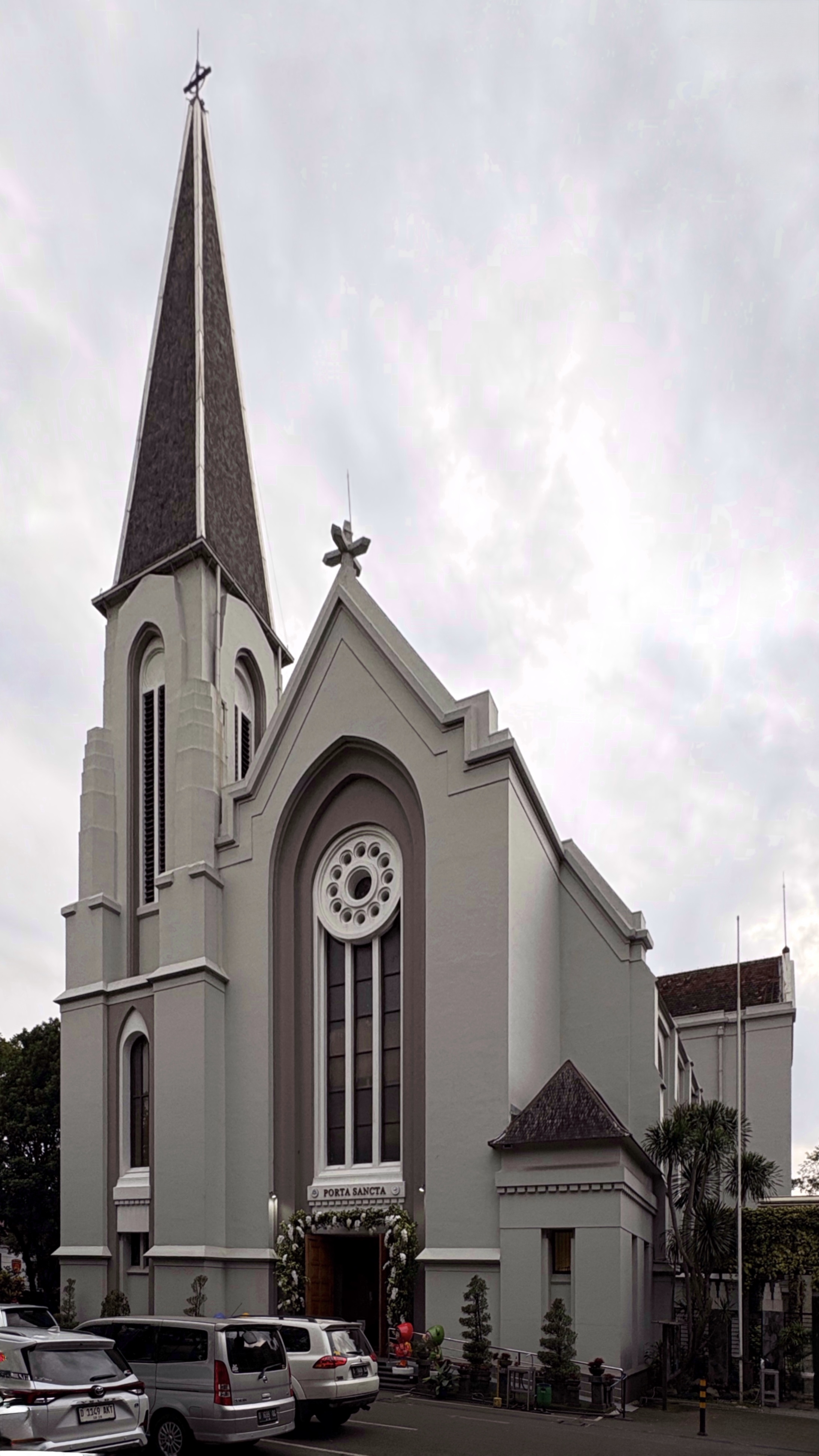
Bandung Cathedral

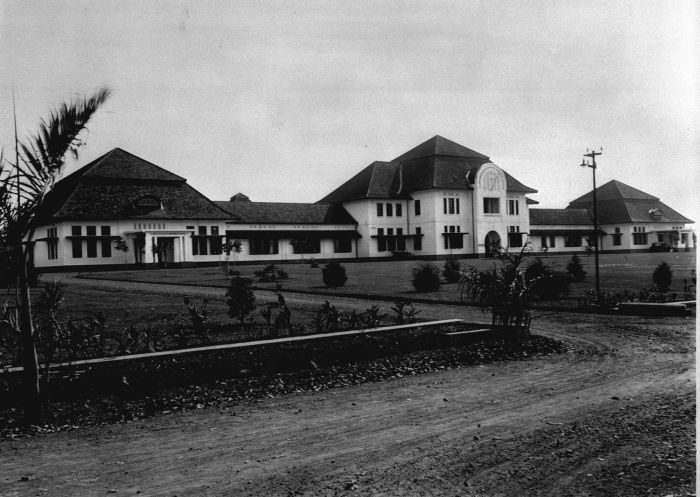
Bio Farma, Bandung

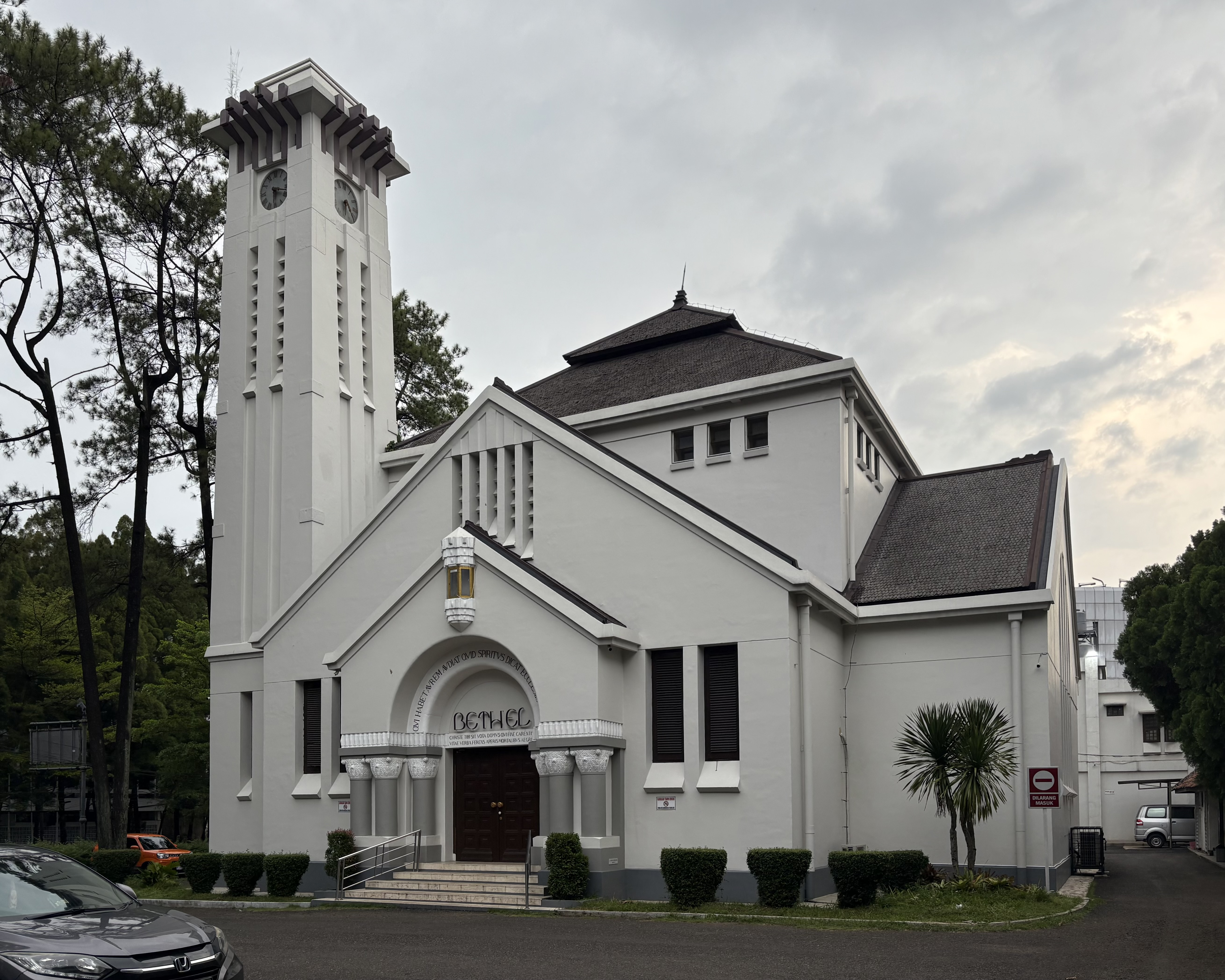
Bethel Church of Bandung

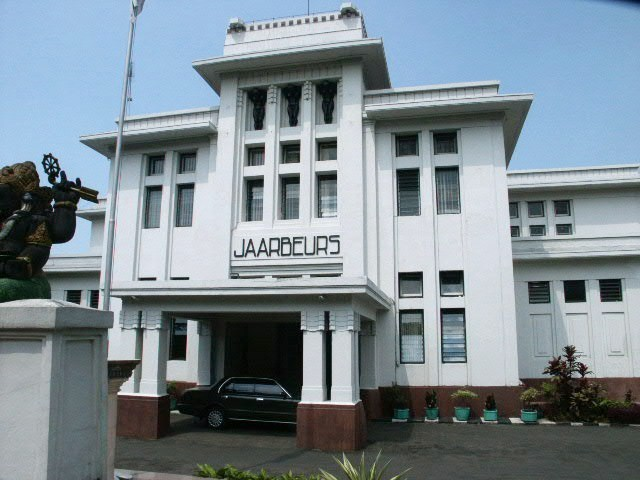
Kologdam Building (Jaarbeurs), Bandung

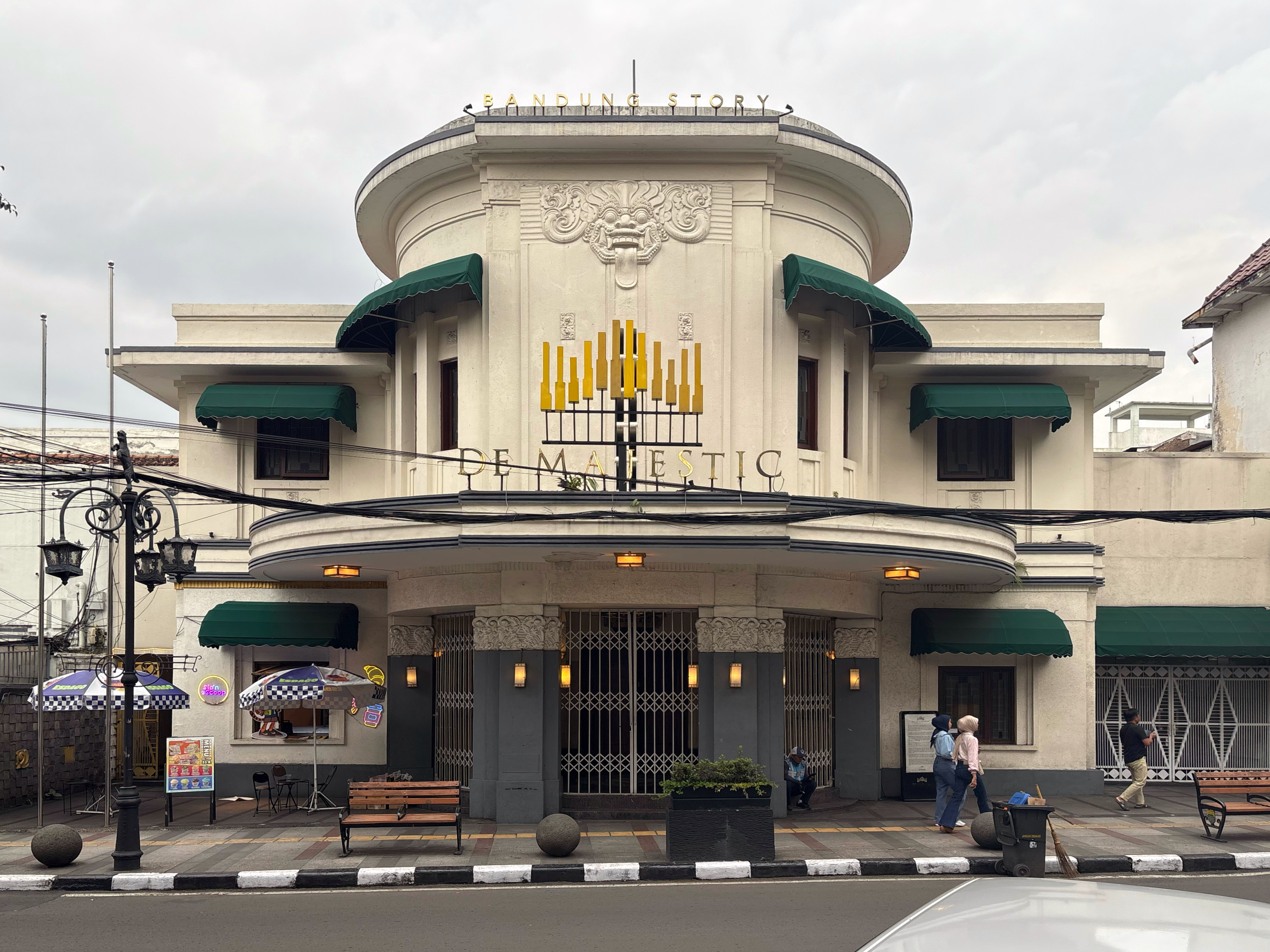
Concordia cinema decorated with Classic Javanese kala head motif on its facade.

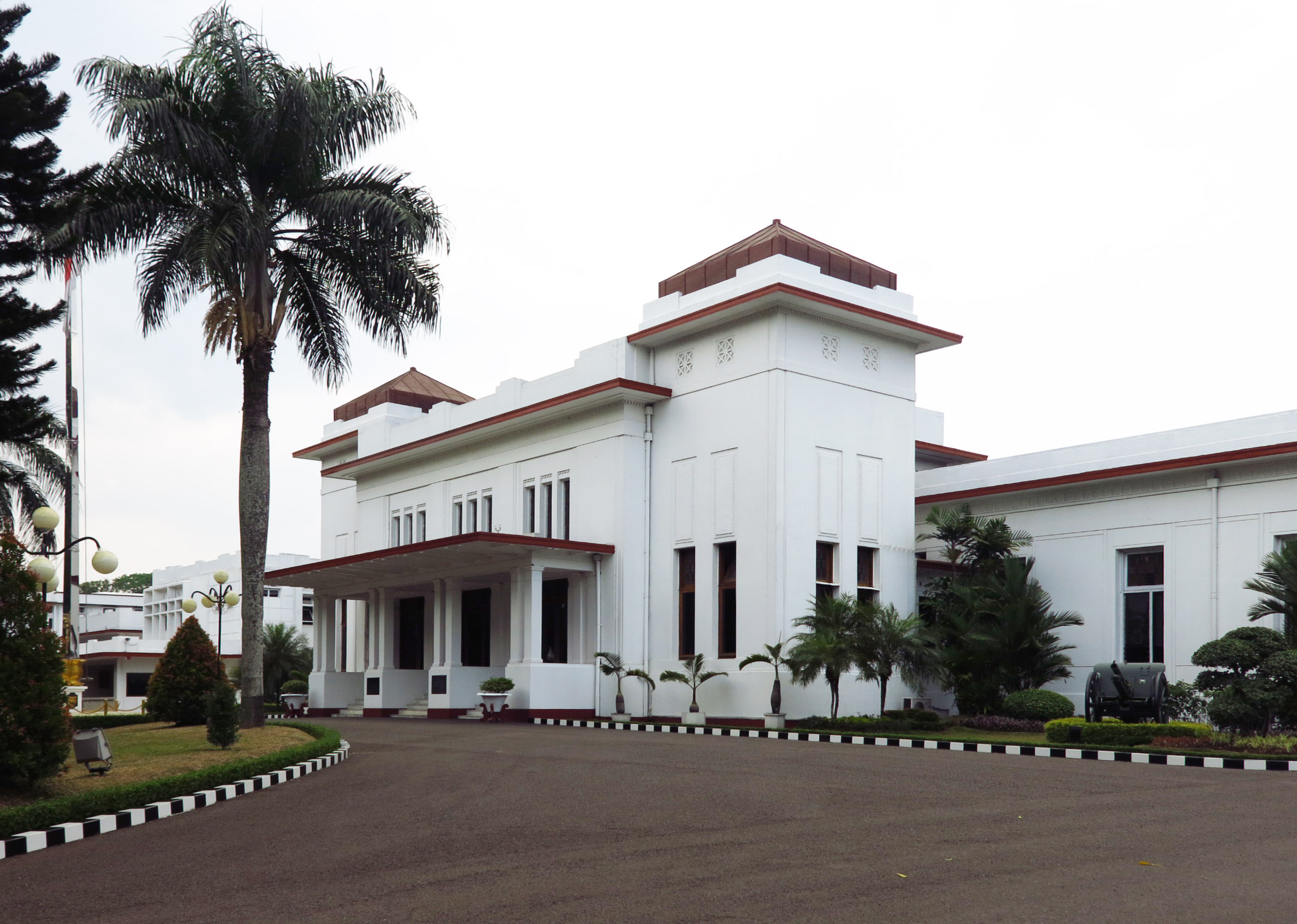
Kodam III Siliwangi, formerly Het Paleis van de Legercommandant

== See also ==
- List of colonial buildings in Bandung
- New Indies Style
- Albert Aalbers
