= Braga Street =

Street in Bandung, Indonesia

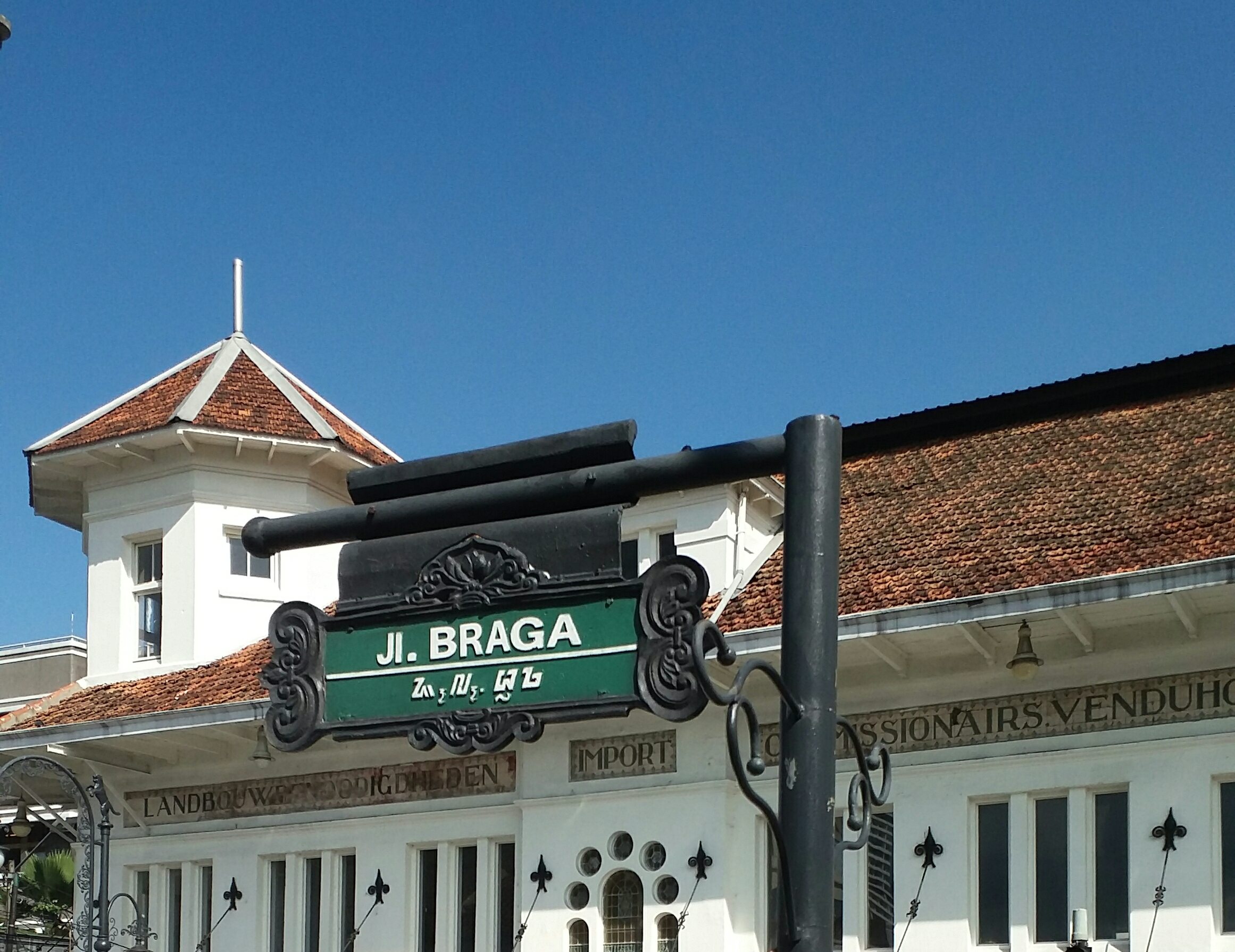
- A sign of Braga Street
- Interactive map of Braga Street
- Native name: Jalan Braga (Indonesian); Braga Weg (Dutch)
- Maintained by: Bandung Department of Transportation (Dinas Perhubungan Kota Bandung)
- Length: 850 m (2,790 ft)
- Width: 75 m (246 ft)
- Location: Bandung, West Java, Indonesia
- Coordinates: 6.9179137°S 107.6094480°E
- North end: Pasteur / Dago / Suniraja Streets
- South end: Tegalega / Kopo / Asia Africa Streets

Braga Street (Indonesian: Jalan Braga, Sundanese: ᮏᮜᮔ᮪ ᮘᮢᮌ) is a street in the center of Bandung, Indonesia, famous in 1920s colonial Indonesia as a promenade street. A European ambiance of chic cafés, boutiques, and restaurants along the street propelled Bandung to attain the Dutch nickname Parijs van Java ("Paris of Java").

Braga Street begins on a T-junction with Asia-Afrika Street (formerly De Groote Postweg), running north until the city council (balaikota).

== Early history ==
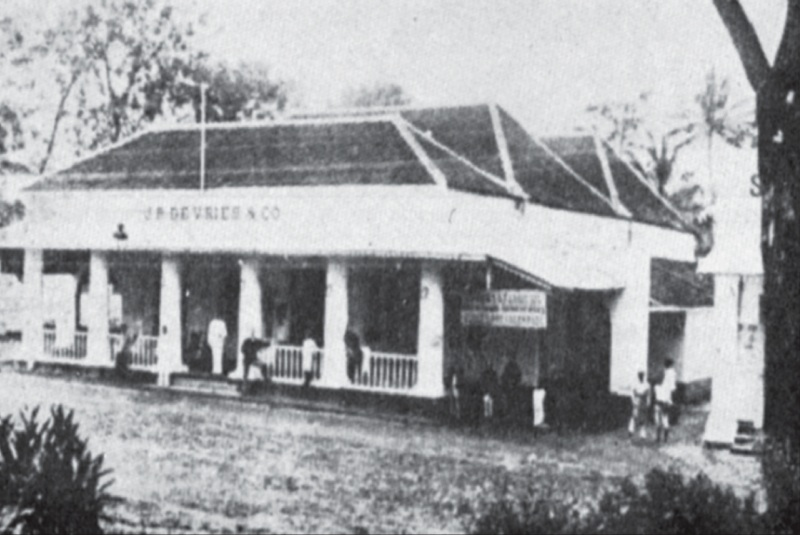
The first grocery store in the city, De Vries, opposite Braga Street.

The first name of the street was Karreweg. The city residents dubbed it Pedatiweg, from the Indonesian language of horse-drawn carriages (pedati), because it was a narrow street (about 10 m or 30 feet wide) that only carriages could pass through. The street was built only to connect the major Great Post Road with a coffee warehouse, owned by a Dutch coffee plantation owner Andries de Wilde (the warehouse is now the seat of the city administration or balaikota). In 1856, when Bandung was the capital of Priangan Regency, some colonial houses were built along the dirt road of Braga Street with their houses thatched with reeds, alang-alang grass or other straw materials.

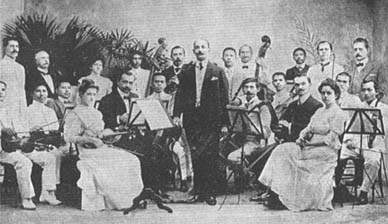
The Toneel Braga musical drama group

In 1882, a theater group established itself at the south part of the street and the Toneel Braga, the name of the drama group, became famous. Residents flocked into the street to watch the group's performance every night and therefore the road was improved by stone pavements, and oil lamps were installed. The street was at that time popularly known as the Braga street.

In 1884, a railroad connecting Batavia to Bandoeng was laid down and the city core grew rapidly. New buildings filled the southern end of the street while the northern end was still a rubber tree forest. The street became more famous with a grocery store named De Vries which sold daily needs for plantation owners. Hotels, banks, cafes and restaurants were opened and the street transformed into a major shopping street.

In the early twentieth century, the street was the most important European shopping street in the Dutch Indies. Several well-known Western companies opened their stores in the street, including Chrysler, Plymouth and Renault car distributors. Colonial bookstores, watches and jewelry retailers and boutique shops were common in the street for the high society.

== Buildings ==
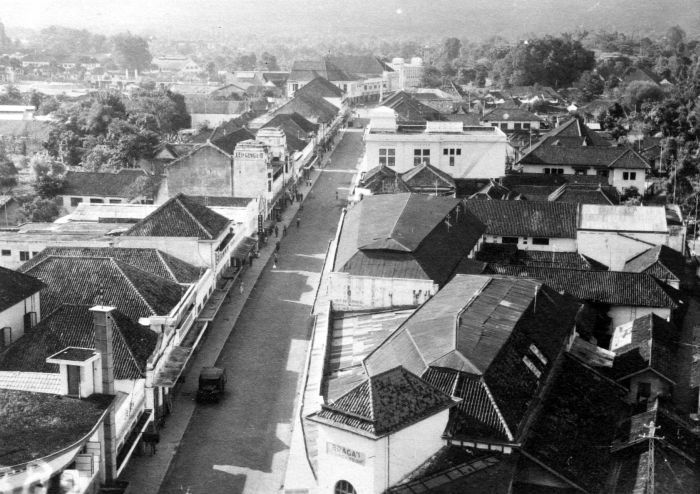
Aerial view of Braga Street in 1947

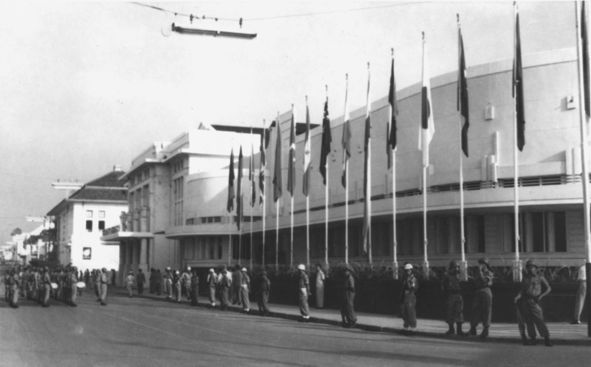
Gedung Merdeka during the 1955 Asian–African Conference

In the 1900s, along with the Dutch East Indies government plan to move the capital from Batavia to Bandung, the government included Braga Street into part of town planning. In 1906, the city council began replacing stone by asphalt and applying a new rule of designing new buildings at the street. Art Deco buildings began to decorate the street and about 50% of which are still present with their original architecture.

Starting from the south entrance, the Gedung Merdeka (Independence Building) stands at the corner, known as the venue of the 1955 Asian–African Conference. Built in 1895 as a clubhouse for the wealthy, the building was first named as the Concordia Society. The building was renovated twice in 1920 and 1928, the last of which was designed by two Dutch architects, Van Galen Last and C. P. Wolff Schoemaker. It is now used as a museum of the conference.

At the southeast corner of the cross-section between the Naripan Street, an eight-stories building is noticeable for its distinctive oceanwave style. Designed by Dutch architect A.F. Aalbers in 1936, the radical modern architecture building was used for the DENIS (De Eerste Nederlandsch-Indische Spaarkas or the First Dutch-Indies Savings) bank. Aalbers applied the Amsterdam School architectural style with its strong expressionism dialect, shown by the rounded curves along the horizontal side and one vertical façade in the middle, but he put also the modernist architecture for the interior design. The building is still used as the headquarters of a regional bank, the Bank Jabar.

== Gallery ==
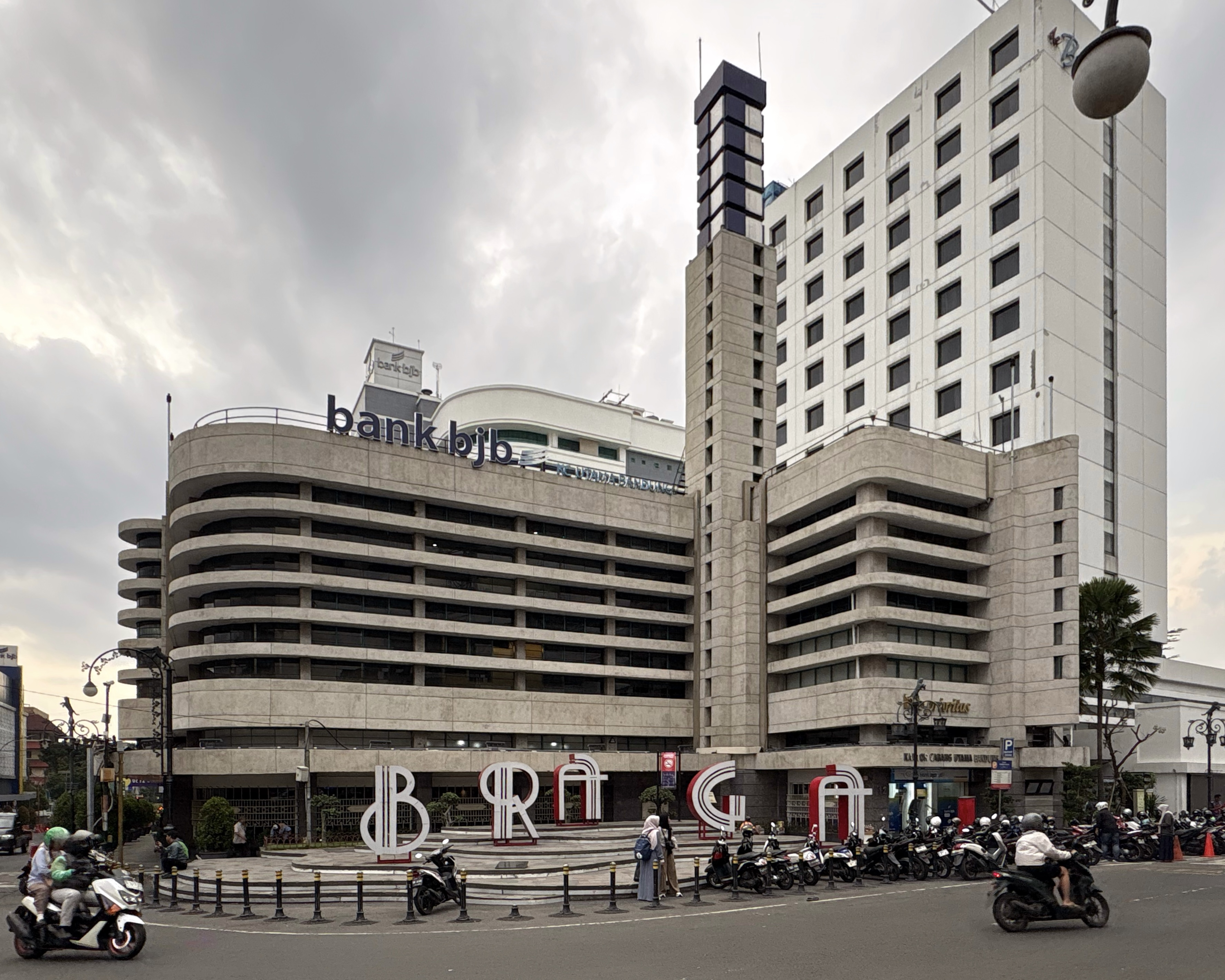
The DENIS bank, Albert Aalbers (1936).

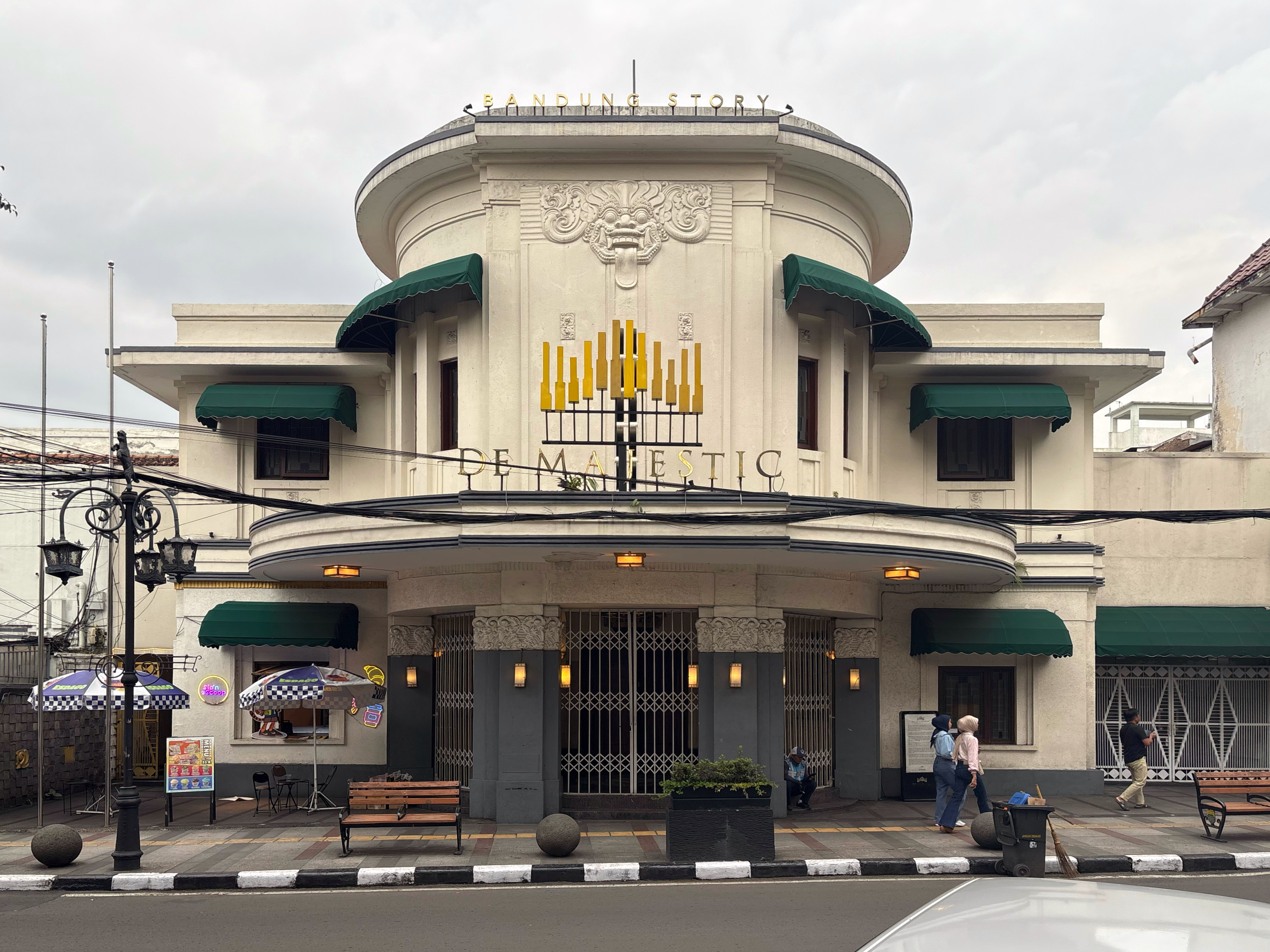
Kala head native element on a Modernist cinema building, Wolff Schoemaker (1920s).

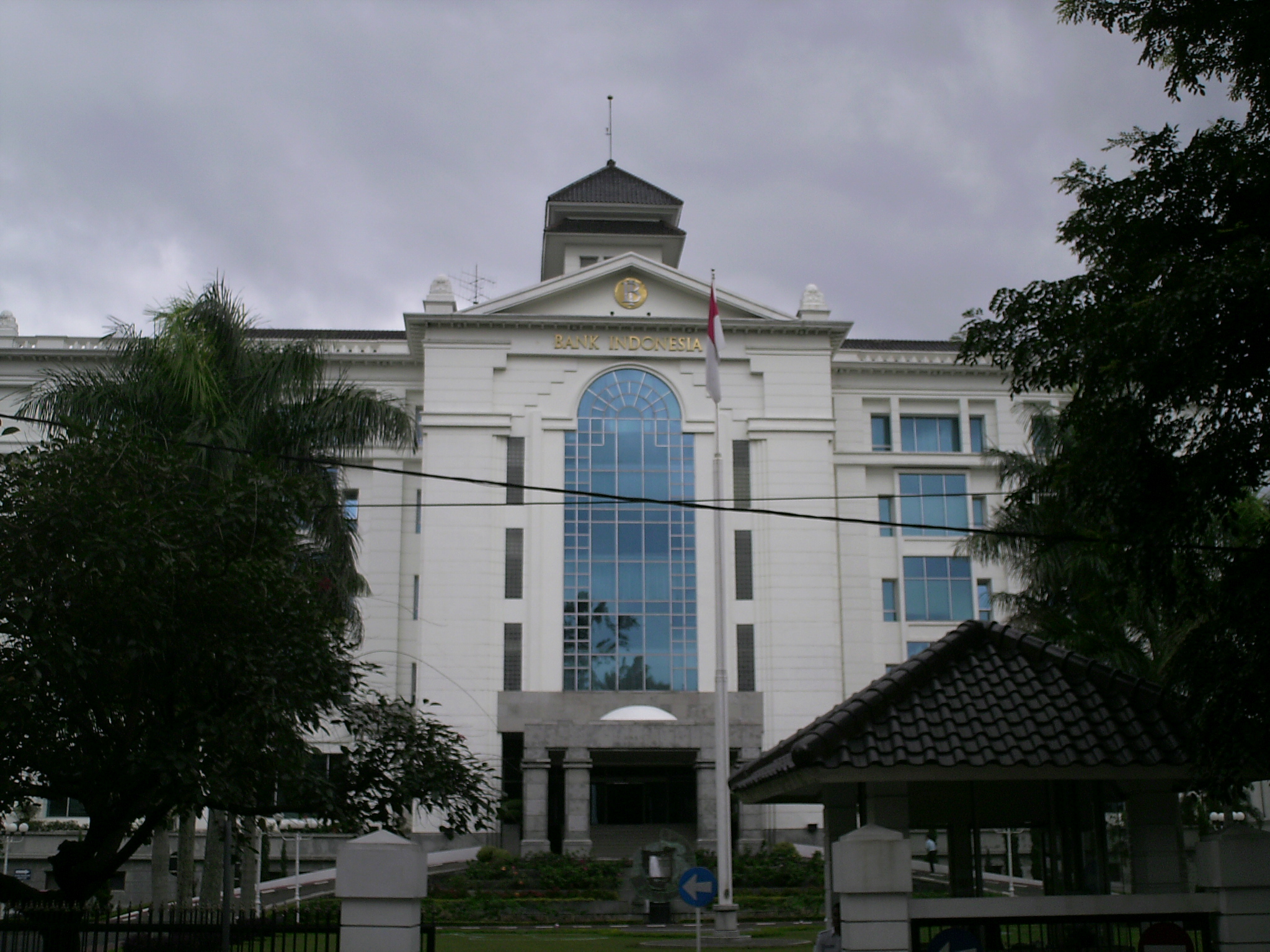
Bank Indonesia building, at the end of Braga Street.

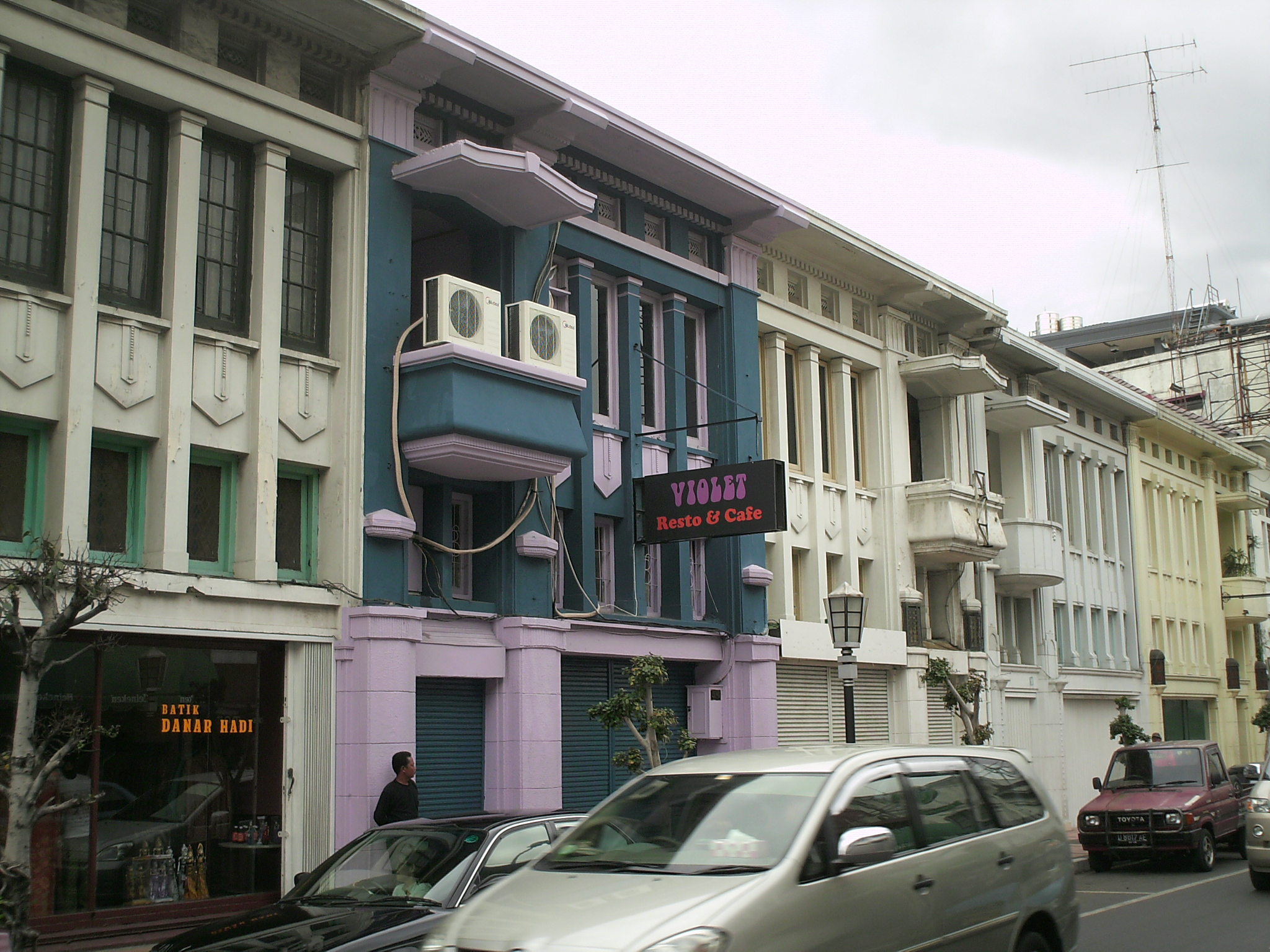
A line of old buildings, one of which has bright colors.

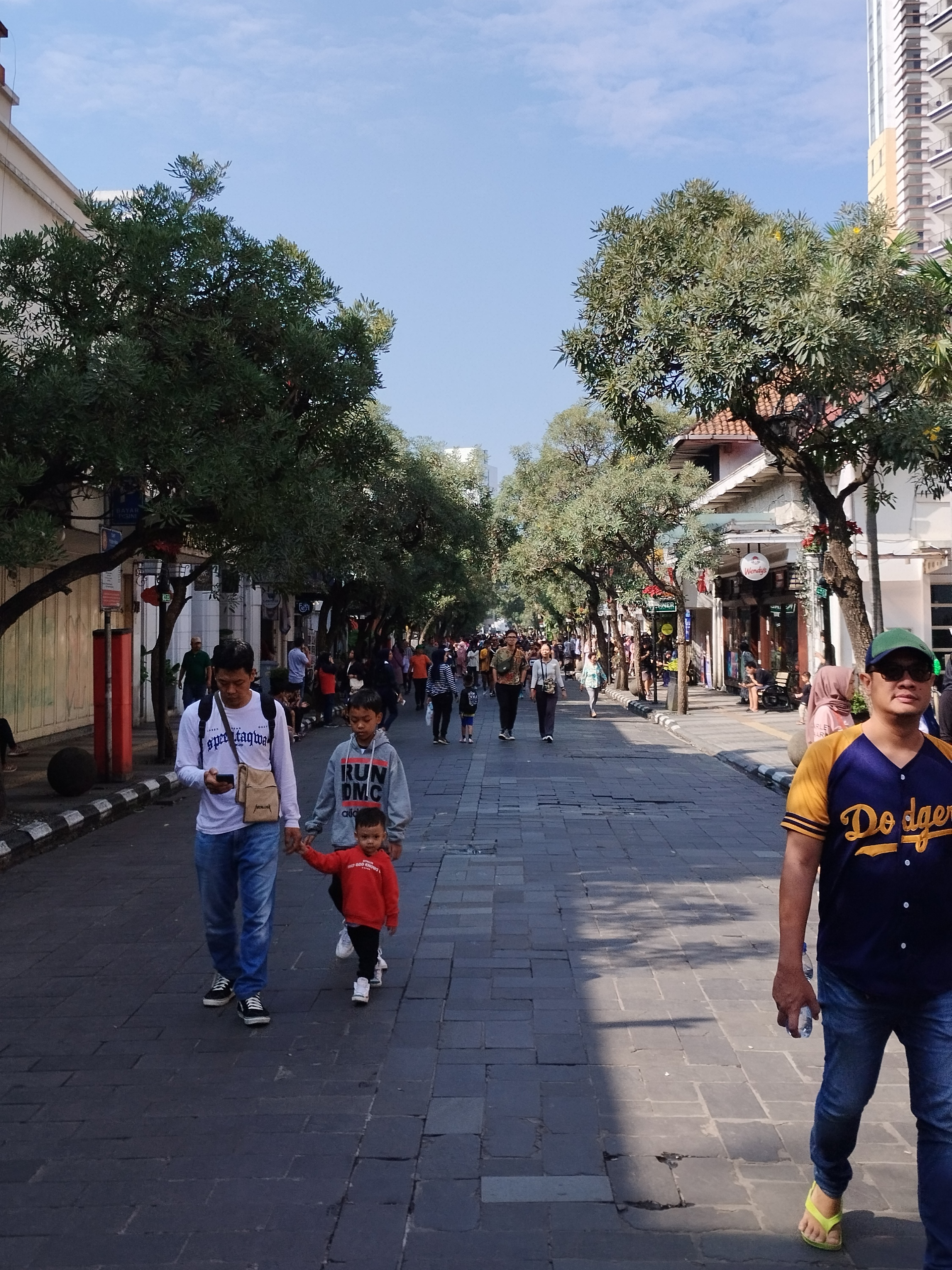
Car free day.

== See also ==
- History of Bandung
- Architecture of Indonesia
