= Kologdam Building =

Building in Bandung, Indonesia

Coordinates: 6°54′35″S 107°37′01″E

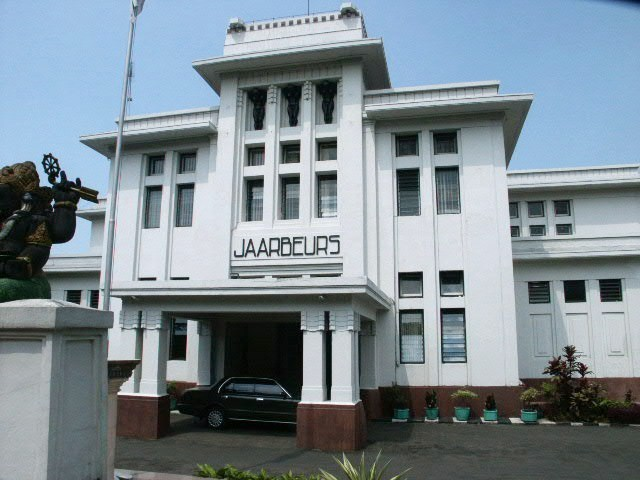
Front facade of the Kologdam Building.

The Kologdam Building (Indonesian: Gedung Kologdam) is a historic building in Bandung, Indonesia. In the 1920s, Kologdam Building was the main building for the Bandung Jaarbeurs (annual trade fair), a complex of buildings and pavilions where annual trade was held. The building is currently a military complex for the Education and Training Command Headquarters of the Siliwangi Division.

== Bandung Jaarbeurs ==
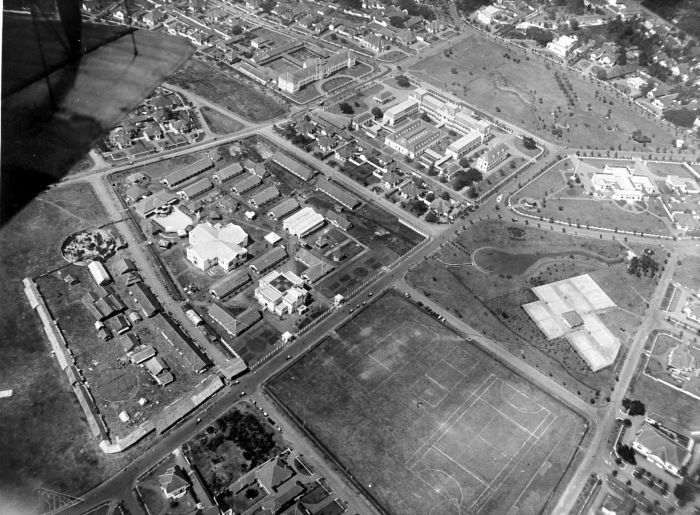
The complex of the fair trade in Bandung Jaarbeurs in 1922, showing several pavilions including the main building and the Machinehal.

The building and the surrounding complex was designed by Wolff Schoemaker, a prominent architect in the Dutch East Indies, and was built in 1920. The first trade fair was held in 1920 from May 20 to June 3, later followed by yearly event every June and July. Various fairs, conferences, and exhibitions of regional industries from Priangan and surrounding area were held in the complex.

== Architecture ==
In 1919, the architect Wolff Schoemaker designed the Trade Fair Center (Jaarbeurs) directly after his study tour to the United States. It was the first plan that he realized since he arrived from a one-year journey in the United States. It was designed in New Indies Style and shows obvious inspiration from Frank Lloyd Wright. It has a cross-shaped floor plan. Three sculptures of human figures decorate the top of the front facade, showing Amsterdam School influence in it design.

== See also ==
- Indonesian architecture
- List of colonial buildings in Bandung
- Jaarbeurs, the annual trade fair held in Utrecht, Netherlands
