= SMU St. Angela =

Coordinates: 6°54′43.4″S 107°36′37.6″E

Santa Angela Bandung
- Bandung, West Java; Indonesia

Information
- Type: Private
- Motto: Servite et Amate
- Religious affiliation: Catholic
- Established: 1905
- Head of school: Dra Henrica Christi Astuti, M.Pd
- Faculty: Natural Science and Social Science (MIPA & IPS)
- Campus: Downtown
- Colors: Red and Green
- Website: St. Angela's Homepage

Santa Angela is a private Catholic school located at Jalan Merdeka 24 Bandung, West Java. It was founded by Dutch Ursuline nuns in 1905. The present buildings were designed by the architectural firm Hulswit-Fermont-Cuypers from Batavia (Jakarta) and the architect Eduard Cuypers from Amsterdam and were completed in July 1922. It is listed as a local heritage site, preventing unauthorised changed to the building's structure. This status cancelled a planned renovation in 2019 to the west building. The school was originally exclusive for female students, but now it also accepts male students. Although it's a private Catholic school, it also accepts non-catholic students. Over the years it has expanded to include 4 levels of education, stretching from Kindergarten, Elementary, Junior and Senior High School. The school's motto is "Servite et Amate", which roughly translates as "to serve".

== Location ==
The school is located at Jalan Merdeka 24 Bandung, West Java. It was built adjacent to the Ursuline convent, which is a branch of the Ursuline convent at Jalan Supratman. The school is located in front of the DPRD building. Located near the school are the Polrestabes Bandung (Bandung Provincial Police Station) and Katedral St.Petrus (St.Peter's Cathedral) which is the seat of the Diocese of Bandung.
