= Albert Aalbers =

Dutch architect (1897–1961)

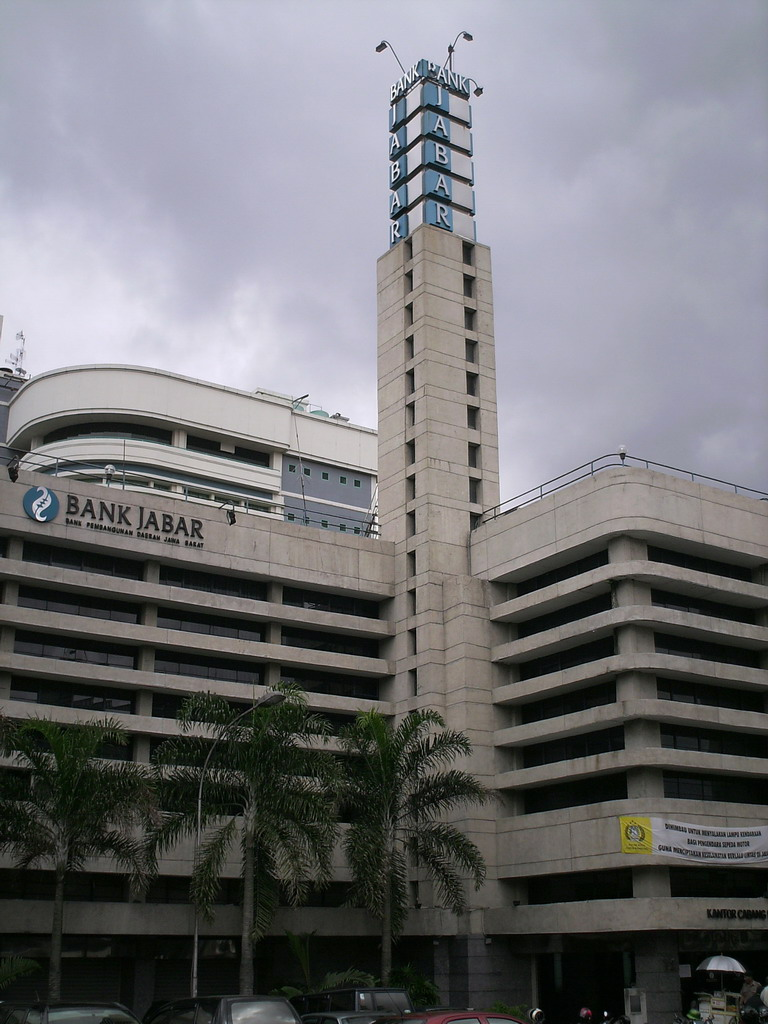
The DENIS bank building, designed by Aalbers in 1936.

Albert Frederik Aalbers (December 13, 1897 – 1961) was a Dutch architect who created villas, hotels, and office buildings in Bandung, Indonesia, during Dutch colonial rule in the 1930s. Aalbers worked in the Netherlands between 1924 and 1930 and then migrated to the Dutch East Indies, working there until he returned to the Netherlands in 1942 due to World War II and political circumstances following Indonesian independence. During his stay in Bandung, in a period when the city was dubbed the city of architecture laboratory, a number of his buildings were considered architectural masterpieces. Aalbers' style was inspired by expressionist Frank Lloyd Wright and modernist Le Corbusier. In Bandung, the DENIS bank (the present-day Bank Jabar) in Braga Street and the Savoy Homann Hotel (last renovated by Aalbers) in Asia-Afrika Street, still carry Aalber's ocean wave ornamentation.

== Early life ==
Born on 13 December 1897 in Rotterdam, the Netherlands, Albert Aalbers was the youngest son of Theo Aalbers and Johanna Buis. Between 1910 and 1918, Aalbers studied architecture at the Rotterdam Academy of Visual Arts and Techniques. At that time Dutch architecture was highly influenced by the expressionist movement due to popular expressionist artists, including the painter Willem de Kooning who also studied in the same school.

In 1923, Albert Aalbers and his brother, Theo, established the Gebroeder Aalbers architecture office in Rotterdam. Their projects ranged from offices to villas. The American architect Frank Lloyd Wright influenced their works. The Villa Dijkendam—owned by Albert Aalbers' future father-in-law's family—is one such example of a building inspired by Wright's works.

== Migrating to the Dutch Indies ==
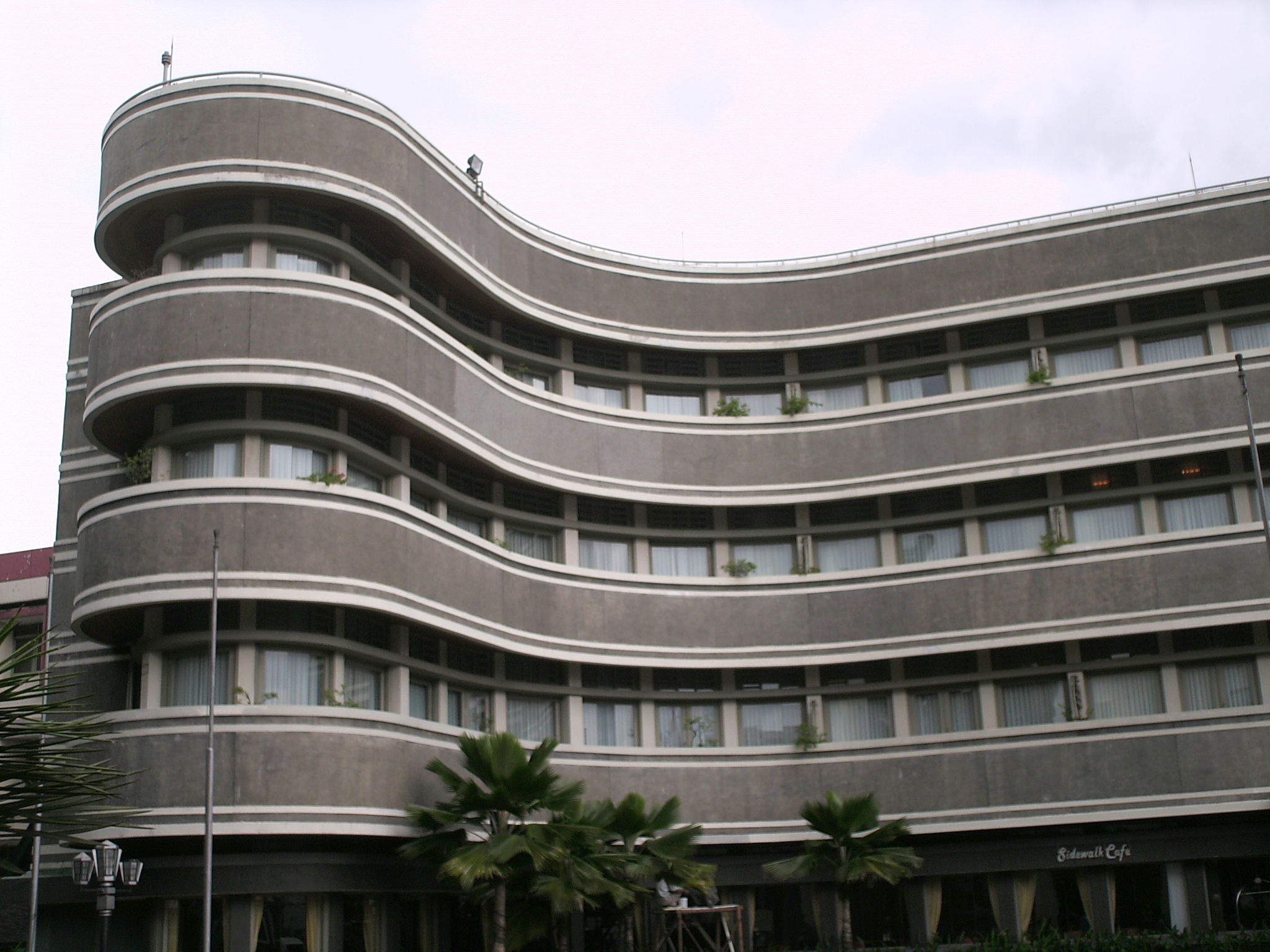
The oceanwave style in Savoy Homann Hotel's design.

1926 was a difficult time for the Aalbers brothers, during which they filed for bankruptcy and closed down their office. Theo migrated to the Dutch Indies while Albert remained to try his luck again by opening an office in Hengelo, in the east of the Netherlands. He married Anna Marie Philipina Lieuwen in 1928 and the couple migrated to the Dutch Indies. At the beginning of their stay, Albert Aalbers worked in a contractor's office owned by J. Bennink in Sukabumi, West Java.

In 1930, the Aalbers family moved to Bandung, a few kilometers east of Sukabumi. At that time, the Dutch East Indies government was planning to move the colonial capital from Batavia (present-day Jakarta) to Bandung. Though the plan was never realized, it transformed Bandung into a city of new European ambience. Several Dutch architects, including Thomas Karsten, Henri Maclaine-Pont, J. Gerber and C.P.W. Schoemaker, were actively involved in designing and renovating buildings throughout the city. Aalbers saw this as a good opportunity and found work as a freelance architect in the city. Later he and his friend, Rijk de Waal, opened a new firm: the Aalbers en De Waal.

== Artworks ==
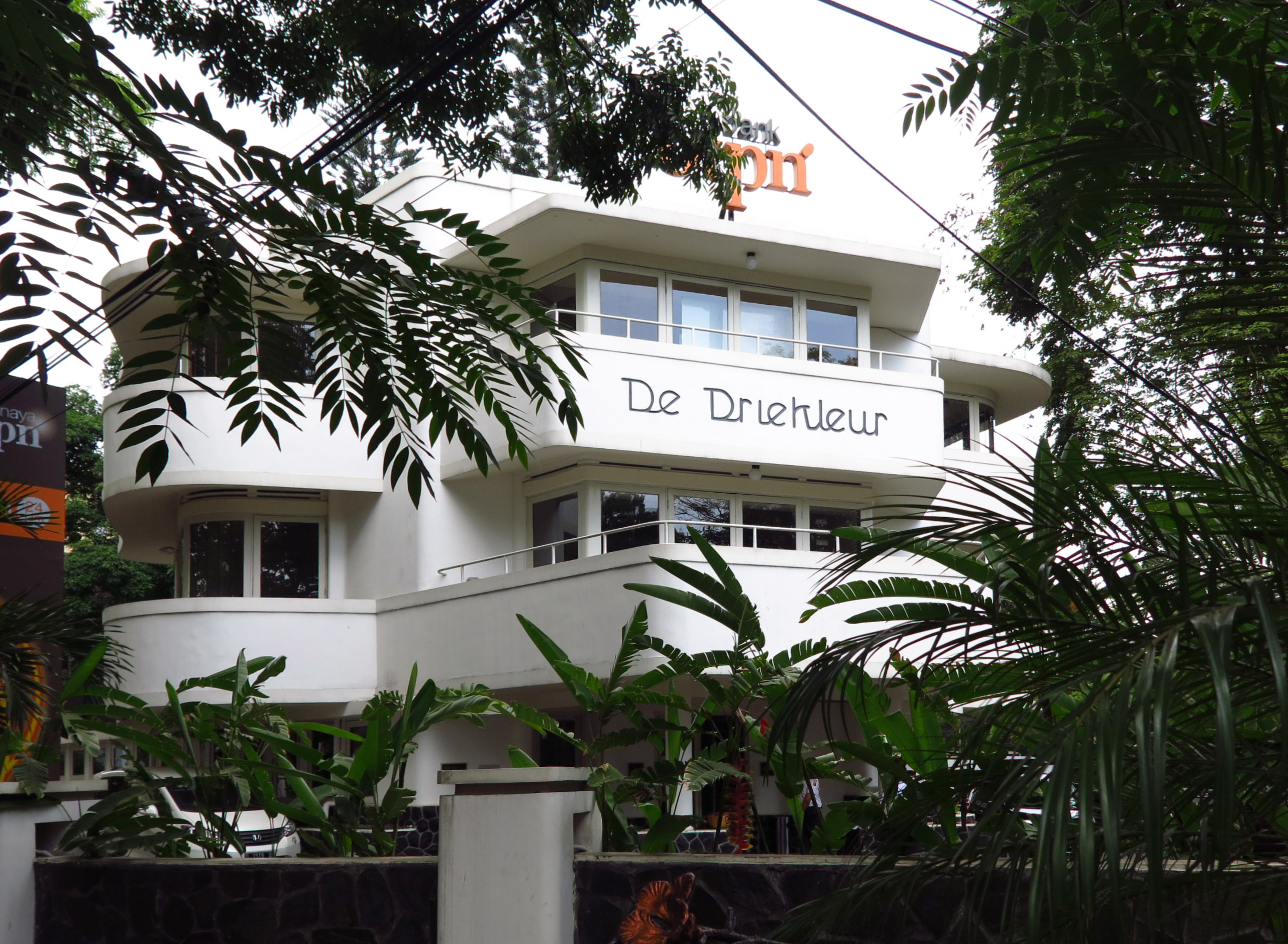
Villa Tiga Warna ("the three-colors"), formerly de Driekleur, a Modernist villa.

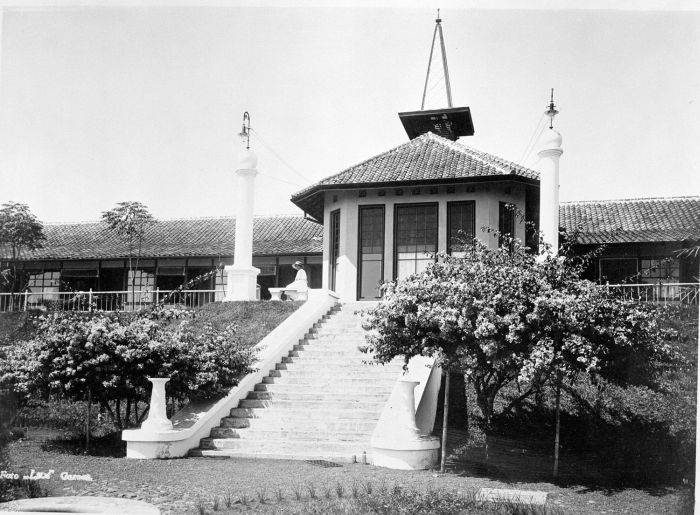
Grand Hotel Ngamplang in Garut

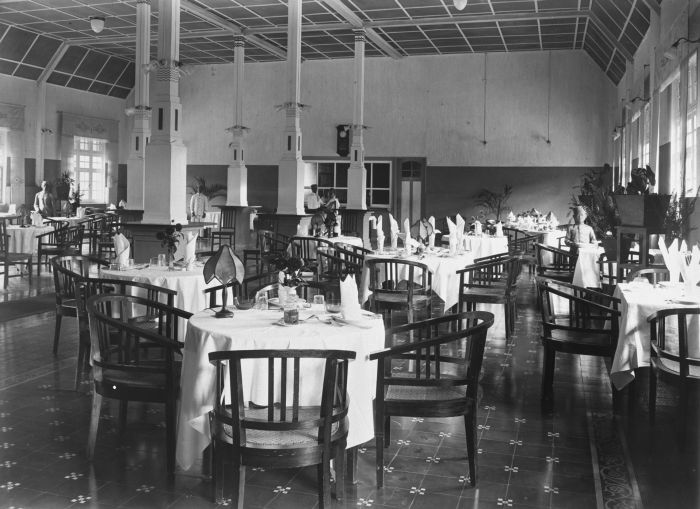
Interior of the Grand Hotel Lembang

In 1935, the Aalbers en De Waal office received a contract to design an office building for the DENIS Bank (De Eerste Nederlandsch-Indische Spaarkas or the First Dutch-Indies Savings). Aalbers used steel materials for the building structure and concrete floors, but he designed the horizontal side with smooth curves as if the materials were made from plastic. As a point of visual contrast, Aalbers put a lift tower in the middle of the building, higher than the six rounded platforms. This articulation point of vertical tower against the horizontal smoothness provides an impression of disrupting the elasticity.

Rounded façades with mainly purely decorative non-functional elements are similar to the Amsterdam School style, but Aalbers was a follower of the International style or modernist architecture that believed form should follow function and eschew such decoration. One pioneer of modernist architecture, Le Corbusier, famous for façades of open space, inspired Aalbers in his designs for the interior of the DENIS bank. The ground floor contains a staircase with glass window leading to a public place, while the second floor is used as offices with large terraces facing Naripan street.

The DENIS bank design was highly appreciated and helped their office receive another contract in 1936, to redesign the famous Savoy Homann Hotel. The hotel was built in 1880 and had been the major accommodation for the wealthy. F Van Es Jr., the hotel owner, asked Aalbers to renovate the hotel with a similar elastic impression as in the DENIS bank. The ocean wave facade and the vertical tower in the middle thus decorate the hotel's exterior, while Aalbers kept the colonial classical style for the interior. The hotel was reopened in 1939 and became internationally renowned. Several Hollywood artists have stayed in the hotel, including Charlie Chaplin and Mary Pickford.

On the recommendation of Van Es Jr., Aalbers' office received more contracts to design hotels. He renovated the hotel lobby of the Grand Hotel Lembang at Lembang, a hillside village north of Bandung. He also designed a new hotel, the Grand Hotel Ngamplang at Garut, and a resort hotel in the middle of the Pangalengan tea plantation in the south of Bandung.

Apart from designing office and hotel, Aalbers was known for his unique villa designs. He designed three identical villas at Juanda Street, known as "the locomotive", in 1937, which were built as a promotion for the new residential area in the north of Bandung. A unique character inside each of the villa is a stair room as an entrance to the asymmetric villa. During his period in Bandung between 1931 and 1942, Aalbers designed twelve identical villas at the Pager Gunung Street (1939), fourteen houses at Haji Hasan Street (1940) and the three-colors (de driekleur) villa at Juanda Street.

== Japanese occupation and later life ==
The three-colors villa was his last work in Indonesia. The Netherlands was on the brink of World War II and the Dutch Indies was occupied by Imperial Japan. The Japanese Occupation Army sent Aalbers and his family to the Dutch intern camp in Cimahi, later transferring them to the Jatinegara camp in Jakarta. Even during his captivity he drew many sketches, including his dream of having a villa in a tropical environment with mountains in the background.

In 1946, Aalbers, his wife and his two daughters moved to Amsterdam. He opened a new architecture office with the name of 'Aalbers en De Waal, Architecten, Amsterdam-Bandoeng'. He put 'Bandoeng' in the name as a wish that someday he would be able to return to Bandung. His hope wasn't realized due to poor health and the unstable political circumstances in Indonesia.

Albert F. Aalbers died in 1961. Much of his work still stands in Bandung, including the DENIS bank and the Savoy Homann Hotel. Some villas he designed were destroyed during the war or have been damaged by subsequent renovations.

== See also ==
- Architecture of Indonesia
- List of colonial buildings in Bandung
- New Indies Style
