= St. Peter's Cathedral, Bandung =

Bandung Cathedral
- Gereja Katedral Bandung (Indonesian)
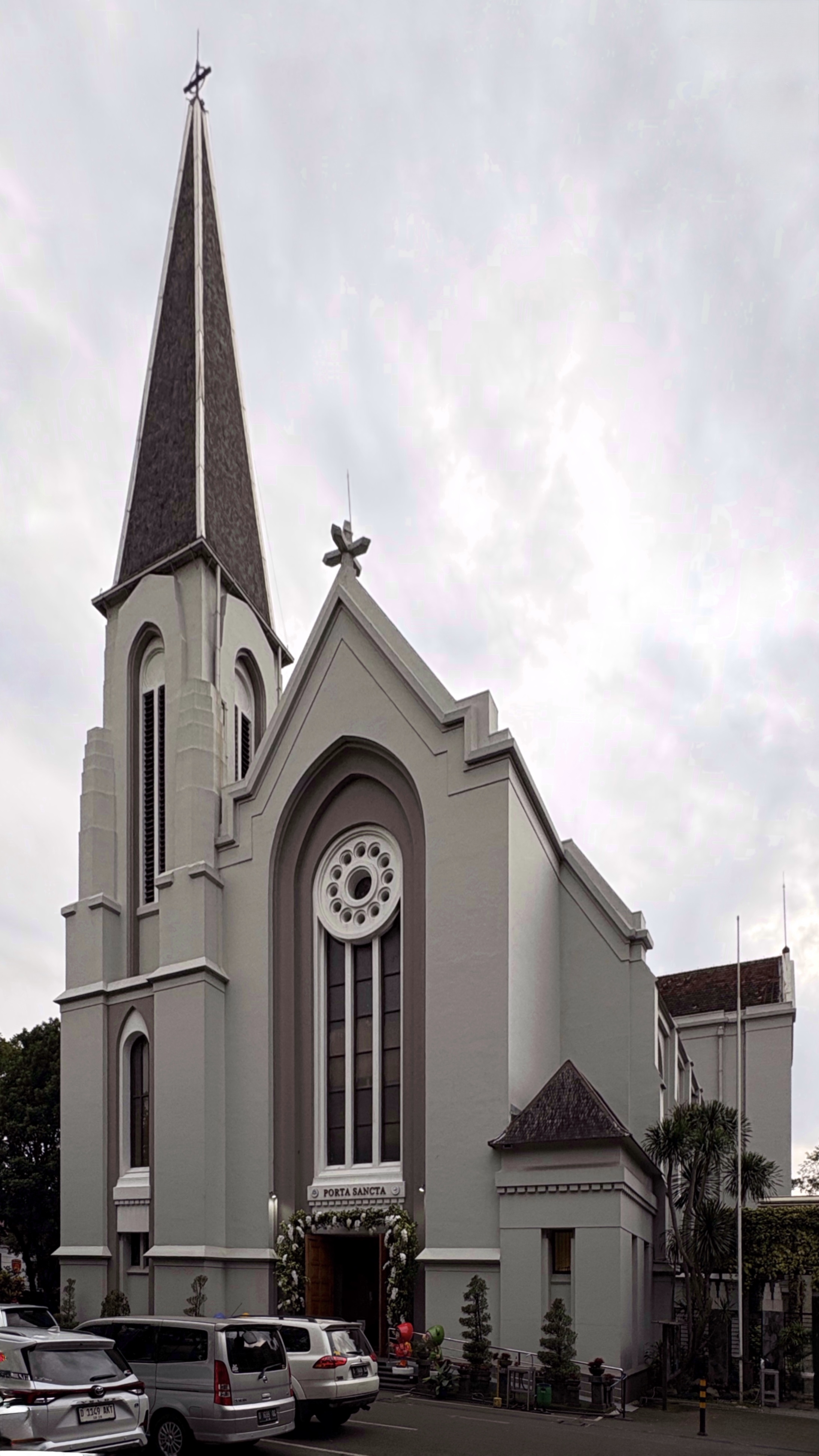
- St. Peter's Cathedral

- 6.914790°S 107.610453°E
- Location: Jalan Merdeka No. 14, Bandung, Indonesia
- Denomination: Roman Catholic
- Religious institute: Canons Regular of the Order of the Holy Cross
- Website: http://www.katedralbandung.org/

History
- Status: Cathedral
- Founder: Jesuit
- Consecrated: 19 February 1922

Architecture
- Architect: Wolff Schoemaker
- Style: Neogothic
- Years built: 1921–1922
- Groundbreaking: 1921

Specifications
- Length: 40 metres
- Width: 15 metres

Administration
- Diocese: Diocese of Bandung
- Deanery: East Bandung

Clergy
- Bishop(s): Mgr. Antonius Subianto Bunjamin, O.S.C.
- Rector: Kosman Parniatan Sianturi, O.S.C.
- Priest(s): Leo van Beurden, O.S.C. Rafael Maria Haryo Adi Pramono, O.S.C. Dedakus Nono Tri Suryono, O.S.C.

Bandung Cathedral (Indonesian Gereja Katedral Bandung), officially Katedral Santo Petrus ("St. Peter's Cathedral"), is the cathedral of the Roman Catholic Diocese of Bandung, located at Jalan Merdeka, Bandung, Indonesia. The building was designed by Wolff Schoemaker in Neogothic style. Bandung Cathedral has a land area of 2,385 m^{2} and building area of 785 m^{2}.

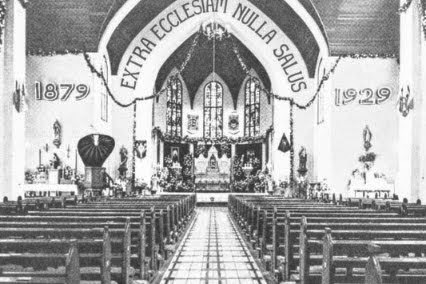
Interior of the Bandung Cathedral in 1929

The first parish church, dedicated to St. Francis Regis, opened on June 16, 1895. After Bandung received the status of gemeente (municipality) in 1906, it was decided to build a new church building. Construction of the new building was started in 1921. The construction was finished in 1922 and the new cathedral was blessed on February 19, 1922, by Mgr. Edmundus Sybradus Luypen, Apostolic Vicar of Batavia.

== See also ==
- List of church buildings in Indonesia
