= Hotel Savoy Homann =

Hotel in Bandung, West Java, Indonesia

Coordinates: 6.92211°S 107.61036°E

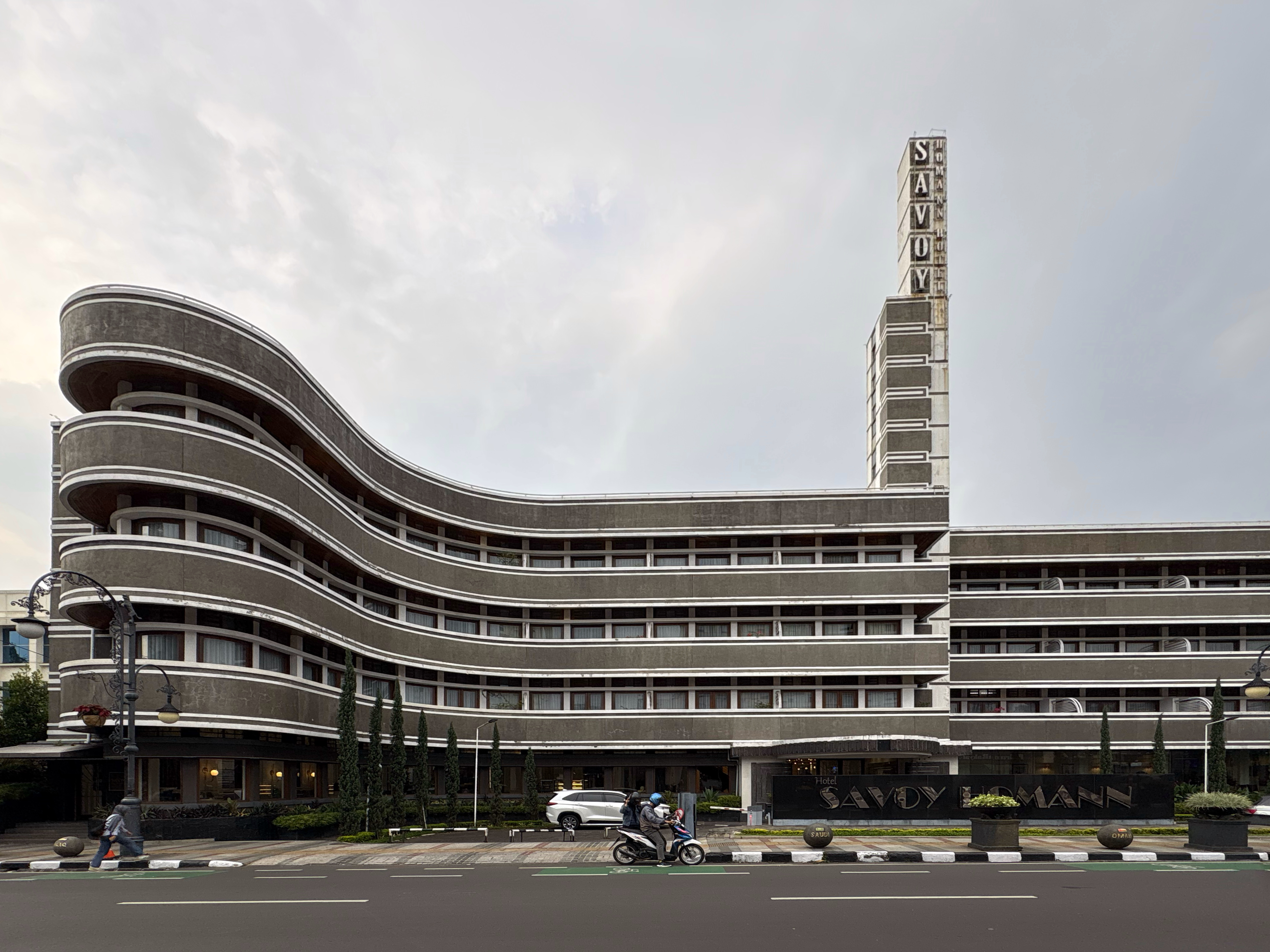
Hotel Savoy Homann, 2025

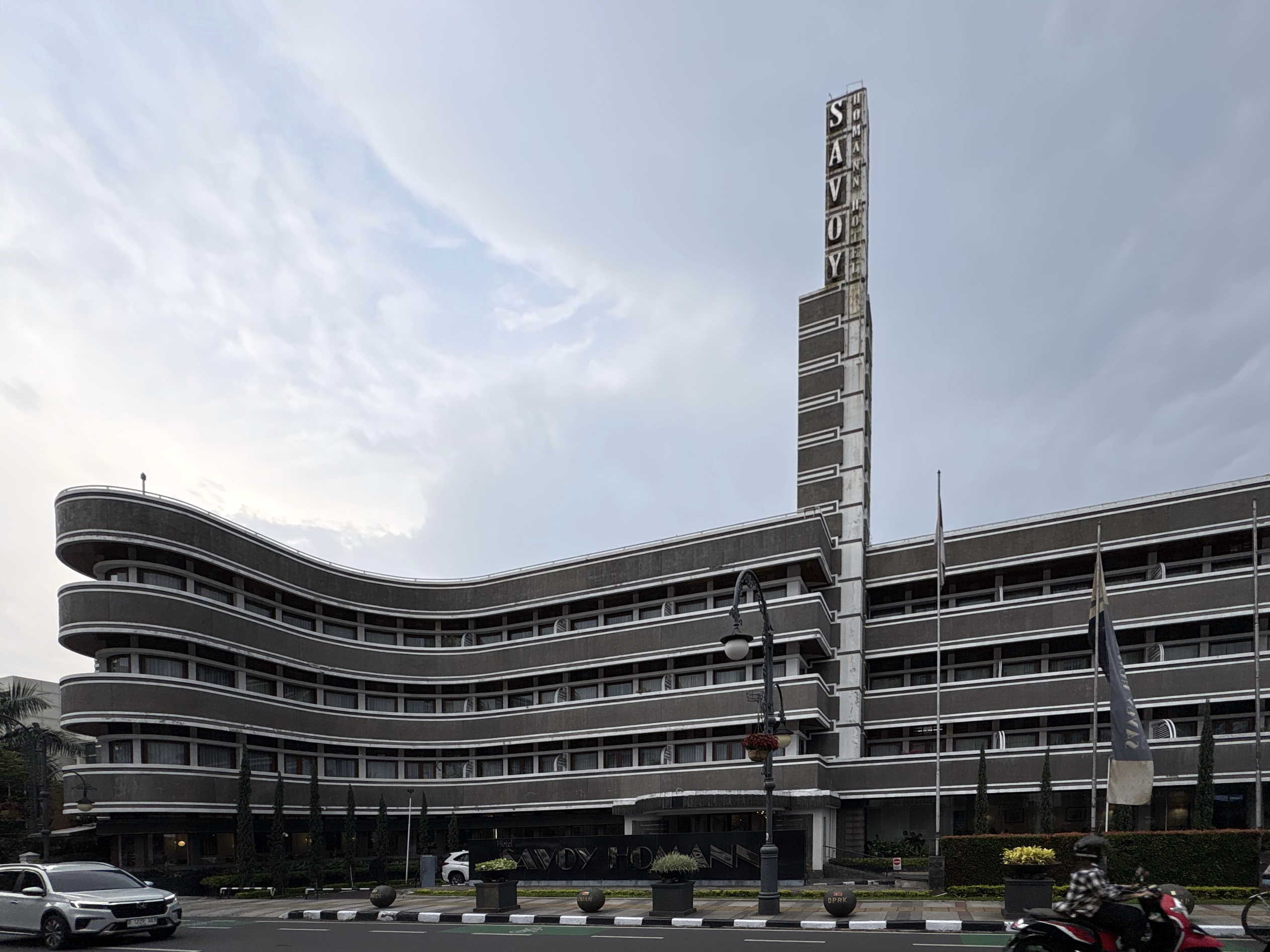
Hotel Savoy Homann, 2025

The Hotel Savoy Homann is a historic four-star hotel located on Asia Afrika Street, Bandung, Indonesia. It was built in 1939, replacing the 19th century Homann Hotel. Designed by the Dutch architect Albert Aalbers, the hotel features art deco exterior and interior, and historic furniture. It is an architectural heritage and a fine example of art deco colonial architecture of the East Indies.

== History ==
=== Origins ===
After the opening of the Great Post Road in 1810, many colonial cash-crop plantations were established in the Preanger area. During the 19th to early 20th century, Bandung has become a popular business, shopping and leisure destination for wealthy plantation owners, in particular in the weekends. As a result, the hotel business was blooming in the city. The predecessor of the present hotel, the Homann Hotel was built in 1871–72, owned and managed by the Homann family. It was famous for its delicious Mrs. Homann's Rijsttafel. This first small building was designed in Gothic-Romantic style.

=== Current Hotel ===
In 1939, the hotel was rebuilt in a curved streamlined art deco style, designed by the architect Albert Aalbers. To emphasize its grandeur and luxury the name "Savoy" was added in the 1940s, which remained unchanged until the 1980s. Some of its celebrity guests during the Dutch East Indies era were Charlie Chaplin and Mary Pickford.

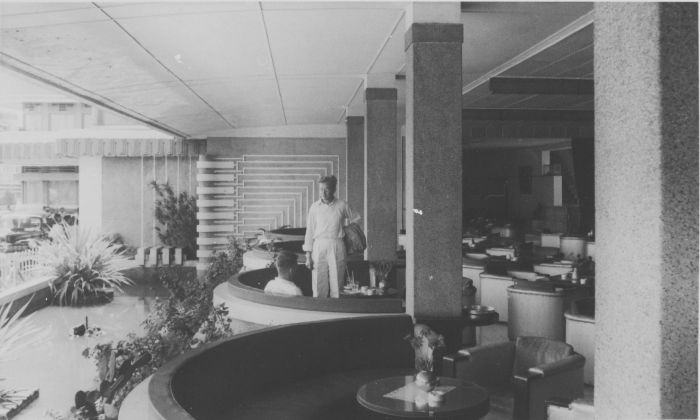
Interior of the hotel in the 1950s

During the World War II Japanese occupation (1942–45), the hotel functioned as luxurious barracks for Japanese soldiers. In 1955, when the first Asian–African Conference was held in Bandung, Savoy Homann hosted VVIP guests and became a part of the Historical Walk. Some of the guests were Sukarno, Ho Chi Minh, Pandit Jawaharlal Nehru, U Nu, Zhou Enlai, Gamal Abdul Nasser, and Tito.

In the 1990s the hotel was renovated and a new wing was added. It was managed for a number of years by the Bidakara Group as the Savoy Homann Bidakara Hotel.

== The building ==
The hotel has three wings: the Tower Wing, Garden Wing and Millennium Wing. It has a total of 185 guest rooms.

== In popular culture ==
- The story in the book Bandoeng-Bandung by the author F. Springer published in 1994, mostly took place in this hotel.

== Literature ==
- William Warren, Jill Gocher (2007). Asia's legendary hotels: the romance of travel. Singapore: Periplus Editions. ISBN 978-0-7946-0174-4.
