= Military history of Indonesia =

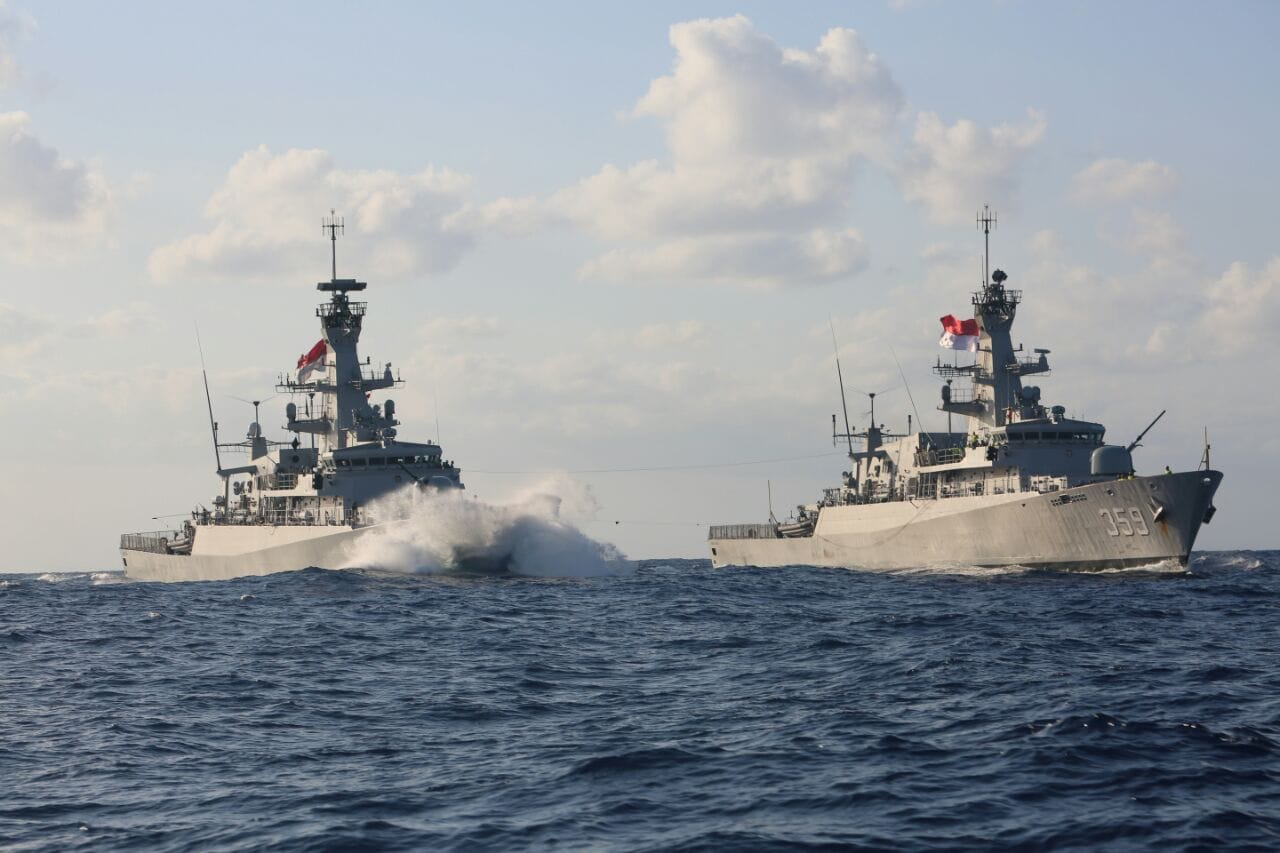
Indonesian naval warships KRI Bung Tomo (357) and KRI Usman Harun (359)

The military history of Indonesia includes the military history of the modern nation of Republic of Indonesia, as well as the military history of the states which preceded and formed it. It encompassed a kaleidoscope of conflicts spanning over a millennium. The ancient and medieval part of it began as tribal warfare began among indigenous populations, and escalated as kingdoms emerged. The modern part is defined by foreign colonial occupations, battles for independence through guerrilla warfare during Indonesian National Revolution, regional conquests and disputes with neighbouring countries, as well as battles between the Republic and separatist factions. Since the formation of the Republic, the military has played significant role in state affairs. However, in Post-Suharto era, the Indonesian military has retreated from politics, yet it still possesses some influences.

As an archipelagic nation, historically Indonesia has always been a maritime power since Srivijaya and Majapahit era. The 7th century Srivijayan empire for example, thrived by maximizing the potential of the sea. During its early formation until the Suharto's New Order era, Indonesian military was heavily focused on its land component. However, by the 21st century, its interest has shifted to maritime sphere, as in 2014 President Joko Widodo has expressed a desire to turn Indonesia into a "maritime axis".

== Prehistoric warfare ==
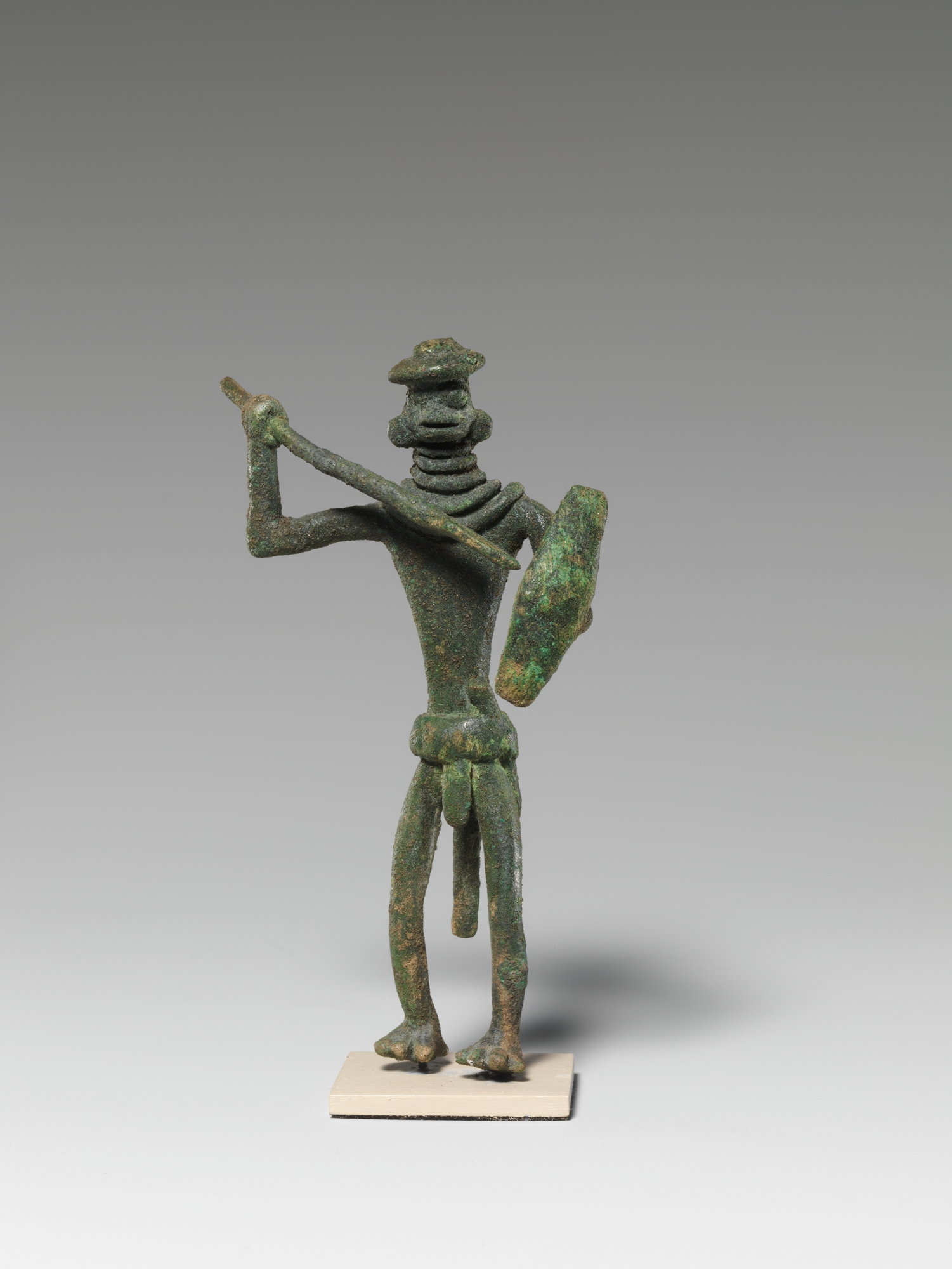
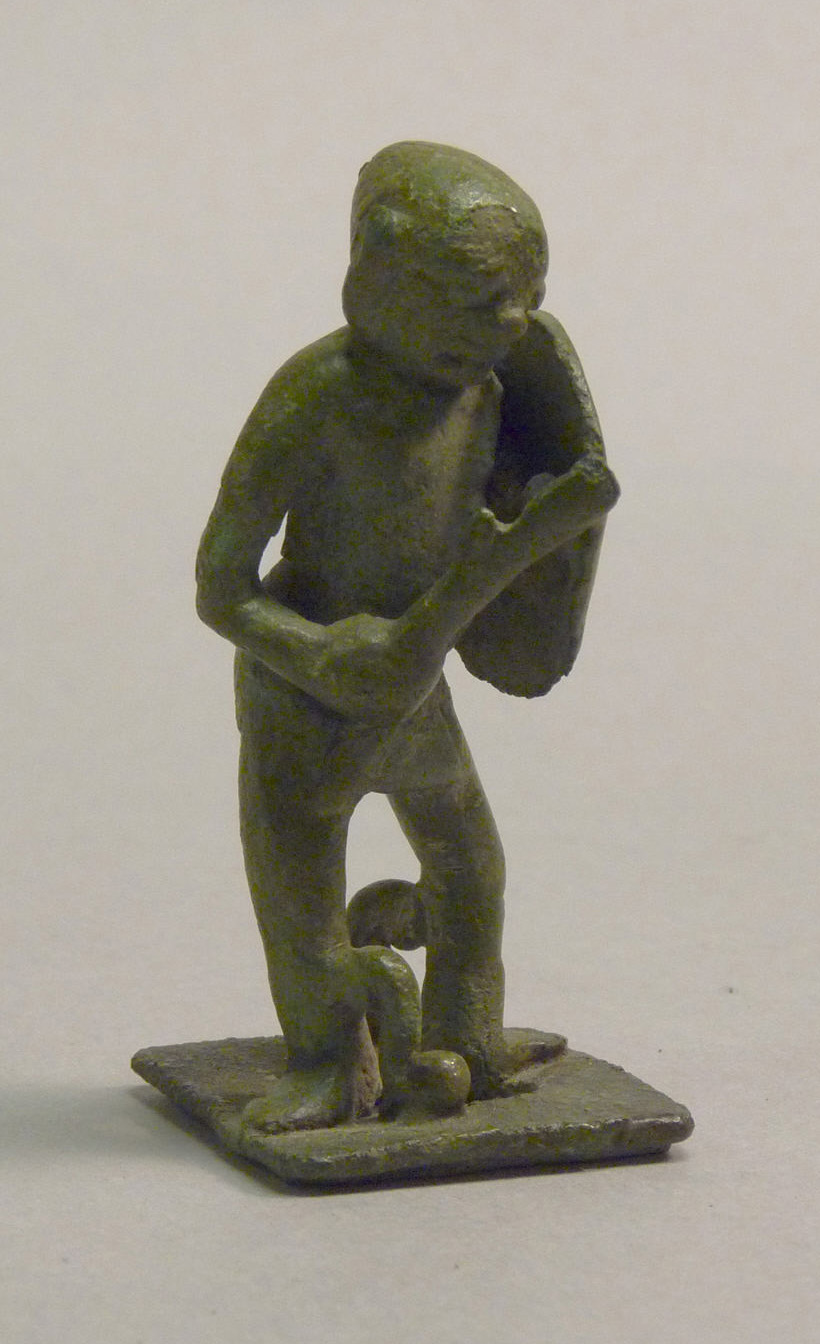
Standing warrior bronze figures, Java, circa 500 BC–300 AD

Archaeological findings dating from prehistoric eras have discovered a variety of stone and metal weaponry, such as axes, arrows and spearheads. Usually used for hunting, they also allowed tribes to battle with each other. Some more elaborate bronze pieces, such as axes, seemed better suited for ceremonial purposes, but showed its influence as an icon. Native edged weapons, such as the parang, klewang, mandau, badik, pedang, kujang, golok and kris, were invented early.

Tribal warfare, although often motivated by resources, lands and slave grabbing, was also a tribal solution to settling disputes, as well as a component of coming of age rituals (headhunting) for several tribes, primarily the Dayak, Nias and Batak. Warriors from militaristic tribes were appreciated by other factions, and were recruited by developed kingdoms and polities as mercenaries, such as Nias warriors serving as palace guards in the Aceh Sultanate, as well as Ambonese warriors recruited by the Dutch East India Company.

Tribal wars still occur amongst Papuan tribes in West Papua, as well as more remote areas of Nusantara, such as the interior of Borneo and Sumatra.

== Ancient kingdoms ==
Greek and Chinese sources mentioned that the people of the archipelago already building large ships from at least 2nd century A.D., the ships could be over 50 m in length and had 5.2–7.8 m high freeboard. These ships are called kolandiaphonta by the Greeks and K'un-Lun po by Chinese.

As ancient kingdoms began to form in Indonesia, at least as early as 7th century B.C., standing units became increasingly prevalent in the region. Indianised Hindu-Buddhist kingdoms saw the establishment of the Hindu Kshatriya caste. Bas reliefs on Javanese temples dating back to the Mataram kingdom, particularly Borobudur and Prambanan, depict battles and soldiers wielding various types of weapons. These weapons were primarily sharp-edged, such as spears, swords, sabre, klewang, golok, as well as stabbing daggers (seeming predecessors to kris). However, blunt weapons such as the Gada, shields, bows and arrows were also depicted.

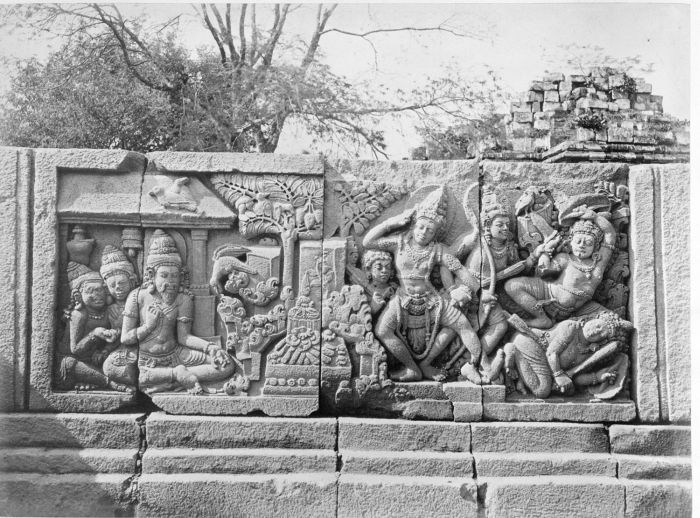
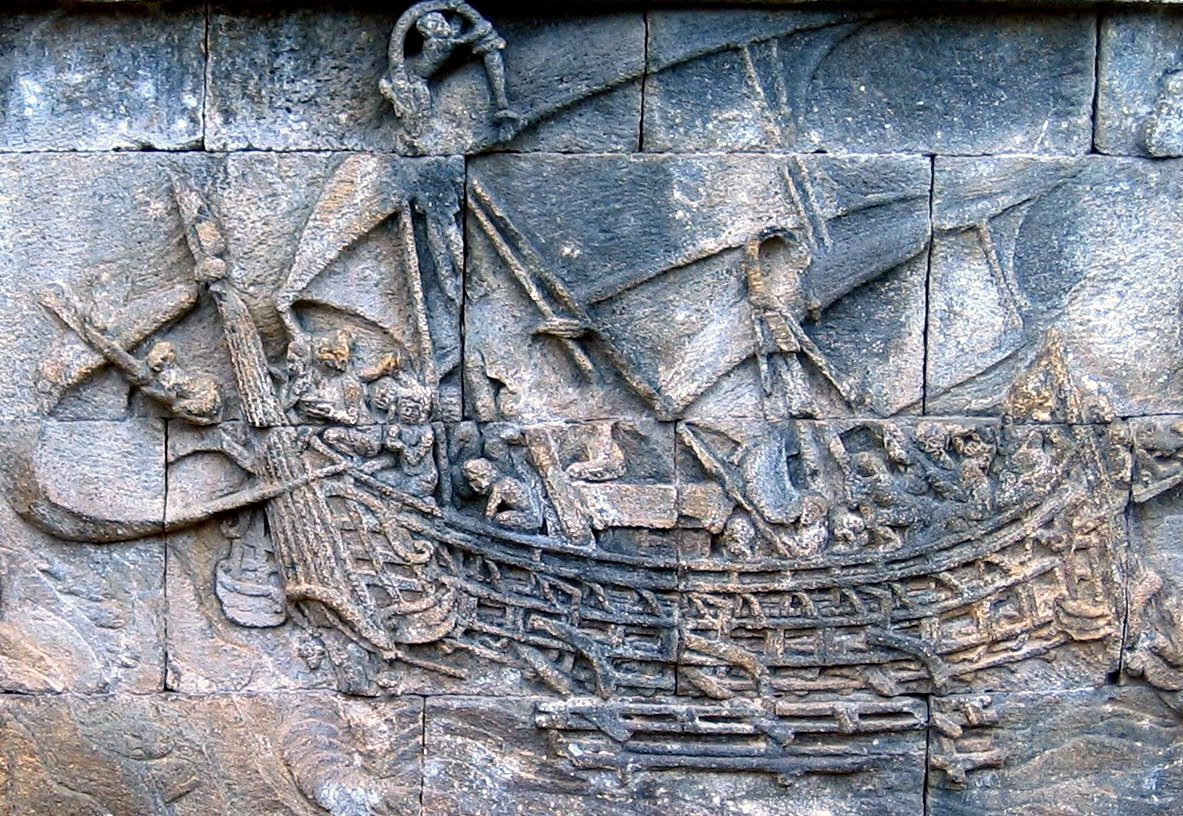
The bas-relief of Prambanan temple a number of images, including a battle featuring weapons like a gada (mace) and archery, and images of a Borobudur ship, a type of ship used by the Javanese people.

Major Indonesian empires such as Srivijaya and Majapahit were known to launch naval raids against neighbouring kingdoms. Bas reliefs from their period depict double outriggered ships, now called cadik. These reliefs show that some kingdoms developed navies and even armadas.

These ancient kingdoms also developed martial arts for use in self-defence and warfare. They are collectively known today as pencak silat.

=== Srivijaya and Mataram ===
Many inscriptions were found that mention Srivijayan activity in the 7th century. The Kedukan Bukit inscription is the oldest record of Indonesian military history, and noted a 7th-century Srivijayan siddhayatra expedition led by Dapunta Hyang Sri Jayanasa. He was said to have brought 20,000 troops, including 200 seamen and 1,312 foot soldiers. The Telaga Batu inscription mentions military titles; such as senāpati (general), cātabhata (soldier), puhāvam (ship captain) and vāsīkarana (blacksmith/weapon maker). It revealed that the empire had specialised military units and formal military occupations. The Kota Kapur inscription mentions a Srivijayan naval expedition against Bhumi Java, and is dated to a period coinciding with the fall of the Tarumanagara and Kalingga kingdoms in Java.

In the 8th century CE, a Javanese launched various naval raids against Cham ports in Indochina. The Javanese continued to dominate areas around present-day Cambodia until the Khmer King Jayavarman II, the founder of the Khmer Empire dynasty, severed the Javanese link later in the same century. In 851 an Arabic merchant named Sulaimaan recorded an event about Javanese Sailendras staging a surprise attack on the Khmers by approaching the capital from the river, after a sea crossing from Java. The young king of Khmer was later punished by the Maharaja, and subsequently the kingdom became a vassal of Sailendra dynasty. In 916 CE, Abu Zaid Hasan mentioned that a polity called Zabag invaded the Khmer kingdom, using 1000 "medium-sized" vessels, which resulted in a Zabag victory. The head of the Khmer king was then brought to Zabag. Regardless of whether the story was true or not or just a legend, it may have a connection with the independence of Cambodia from Javanese suzerainty in 802 CE. Zabag might corresponds to Jawaka/Javaka, which may refer to Java or South Sumatra.

The 10th-century Arab account Ajayeb al-Hind (Marvels of India) gives an account of invasion in Africa by people called Wakwak or Waqwaq, probably the Malay people of Srivijaya or Javanese people of Mataram kingdom, in 945–946 CE. They arrived in the coast of Tanganyika and Mozambique with 1000 boats and attempted to take the fortress of Qanbaloh, though eventually failed. The reason for the attack is because that place had goods demanded by their country and China, such as ivory, tortoise shells, panther skins, and ambergris, and also because they wanted black slaves from Bantu people (called Zeng or Zenj by Arabs, Jenggi by Javanese) who were strong and make good slaves. The existence of black Africans was recorded until the 15th century in Old Javanese inscriptions and the Javanese were still recorded as exporting black slaves during the Ming dynasty era. According to Waharu IV inscription (931 AD) and Garaman inscription (1053 AD), the Mataram kingdom and Airlangga's era Kahuripan kingdom (1000–1049 AD) of Java experienced a long prosperity so that it needed a lot of manpower, especially to bring crops, packings, and send them to ports. Black labor was imported from Jenggi (Zanzibar), Pujut (Australia), and Bondan (Papua). According to Naerssen, they arrived in Java by trading (bought by merchants) or being taken prisoner during a war and then made slaves.

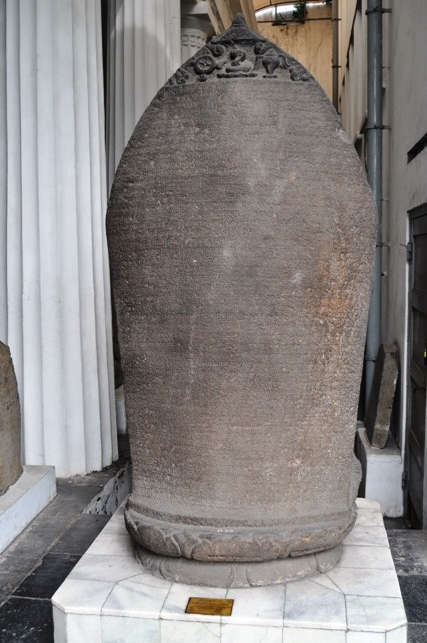
The Anjukladang stone steele commemorated the Javanese Mataram successful effort to repel Srivijayan attack in 935.

In the late 10th century, animosity between the Sumatran Srivijaya and Javanese Mataram kingdom escalated. The Anjukladang inscription, dated to 937, commemorated the Javanese Mataram successful effort to repel Srivijayan attack. In 990 AD, King Dharmawangsa of Mataram launched a naval invasion against Srivijaya, and unsuccessfully attempted to capture Palembang. Dharmawangsa's invasion led the Maharaja of Srivijaya, Sri Cudamani Warmadewa to seek protection from China. His diplomatic skills saw him securing Chinese support through appeasement, by building a Buddhist temple to honour the Chinese emperor. In 1006 AD, Srivijaya successfully repelled the Javanese invasion, and in retaliation and alarm, assisted Haji (king) Wurawari of Lwaram to revolt, destroying the Mataram palace. With the death of Dharmawangsa and the fall of the Mataram capital, Srivijaya collapsed the Mataram kingdom.

In 1025 Rajendra Chola, the Chola king from Coromandel in South India, launched naval raids on ports of Srivijaya and conquered Kadaram (modern Kedah) from Srivijaya. Further battles with the Chola dynasty marked the decline of Srivijayan military might.

=== Majapahit ===
After defeating Srivijaya's successor, the Dharmasraya kingdom, in Sumatra on 1275, the kingdom of Singhasari in Java became the most powerful kingdom in the region. King Kertanegara launched the Pamalayu expedition against Sumatran states and conquered them. Having taken notice of these conquests, the Mongol Yuan dynasty of China demanded tribute to be sent to Kublai Khan's court by Java. Kertanegara responded by insulting and torturing Khan's envoy, and Kublai Khan sent an armada of 1000 ships in retaliation.

Meanwhile, Jayakatwang, the ruler of the Gelang-Gelang (Kediri) kingdom, revolted against Kertanegara, killing him and destroying the Singhasari kingdom. Raden Wijaya, the son in law of Kertanegara, led Mongol forces during the Mongol invasion of Java to Jayakatwang to oust him. Raden Wijaya then turned back against Mongol forces, and drove them out to the sea. Raden Wijaya then established the Majapahit kingdom in 1293. Majapahit would be plagued by regional rebellions, such as the rebellions of Sadeng and Keta, rebellion of Ranggalawe, and Nambi. After that, under the able and aggressive leader Gajah Mada, Majapahit spread its influence beyond Java and Sumatra, to the rest of the Nusantara archipelago.

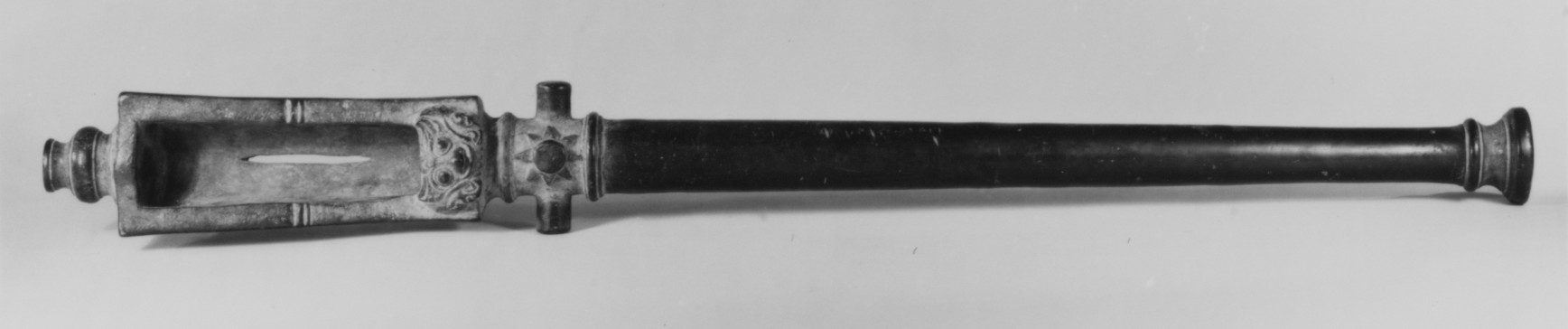
Majapahit cetbang cannon from the Metropolitan Museum of Art, New York. The Surya Majapahit emblem can be seen.

Gunpowder technology entered Java in the Mongol invasion of Java (1293 A.D.). Majapahit under Mahapatih (prime minister) Gajah Mada utilized gunpowder technology obtained from the Yuan dynasty for use in the naval fleet. During the following years, the Majapahit army have begun producing cannons known as cetbang. Early cetbang (also called Eastern-style cetbang) resembled Chinese cannons and hand cannons. Eastern-style cetbangs were mostly made of bronze and were front-loaded cannons. It fires arrow-like projectiles, but round bullets and co-viative projectiles can also be used. These arrows can be solid-tipped without explosives, or with explosives and incendiary materials placed behind the tip. Near the rear, there is a combustion chamber or room, which refers to the bulging part near the rear of the gun, where the gunpowder is placed. The cetbang is mounted on a fixed mount, or as a hand cannon mounted on the end of a pole. There is a tube-like section on the back of the cannon. In the hand cannon type cetbang, this tube is used as socket for a pole.

Because of the close maritime relations of the Nusantara archipelago with the territory of West India, after 1460 new types of gunpowder weapons entered the archipelago through Arab intermediaries. This weapon seems to be cannon and gun of Ottoman tradition, for example the prangi, which is a breech-loading swivel gun. It resulted in a new type of cetbang, called "Western-style cetbang". It can be mounted as a fixed or swivel gun, small-sized ones can be easily installed on small vessels. In naval combat, this gun is used as an anti-personnel weapon, not anti-ship. In this age, even to the 17th century, the Nusantara soldiers fought on a platform called balai and performed boarding actions. Loaded with scatter shots (grapeshot, case shot, or nails and stones) and fired at close range, the cetbang would have been effective at this type of fighting.

In 1350, Majapahit launched its largest military expedition, the invasion of Pasai, with 400 large jong and uncountable number of malangbang and kelulus. The second largest military expedition, invasion of Singapura in 1398, Majapahit deployed 300 jong with no less than 200,000 men. The average jong used by Majapahit would be about 76.18–79.81 m LOA, carrying 600–700 men, with 1200–1400 tons deadweight. The largest ones would be about 88.56 m LOA, they would carry 1000 men on board with 2000 tons deadweight.

During the reign of Hayam Wuruk, Majapahit was involved in a battle against the royal family of Sunda Kingdom in the Battle of Bubat. However, the Regreg war of 1404 to 1406 drained the coffers of the Majapahit kingdom, and led to its decline in the following years.

== Islamic states ==
For centuries, numerous kingdoms rose and fell in the Indonesian archipelago. By the 15th century, Islamic states began to spread their influence, as a number of Sultanates started flourishing in Indonesia.

=== Mataram Sultanate ===
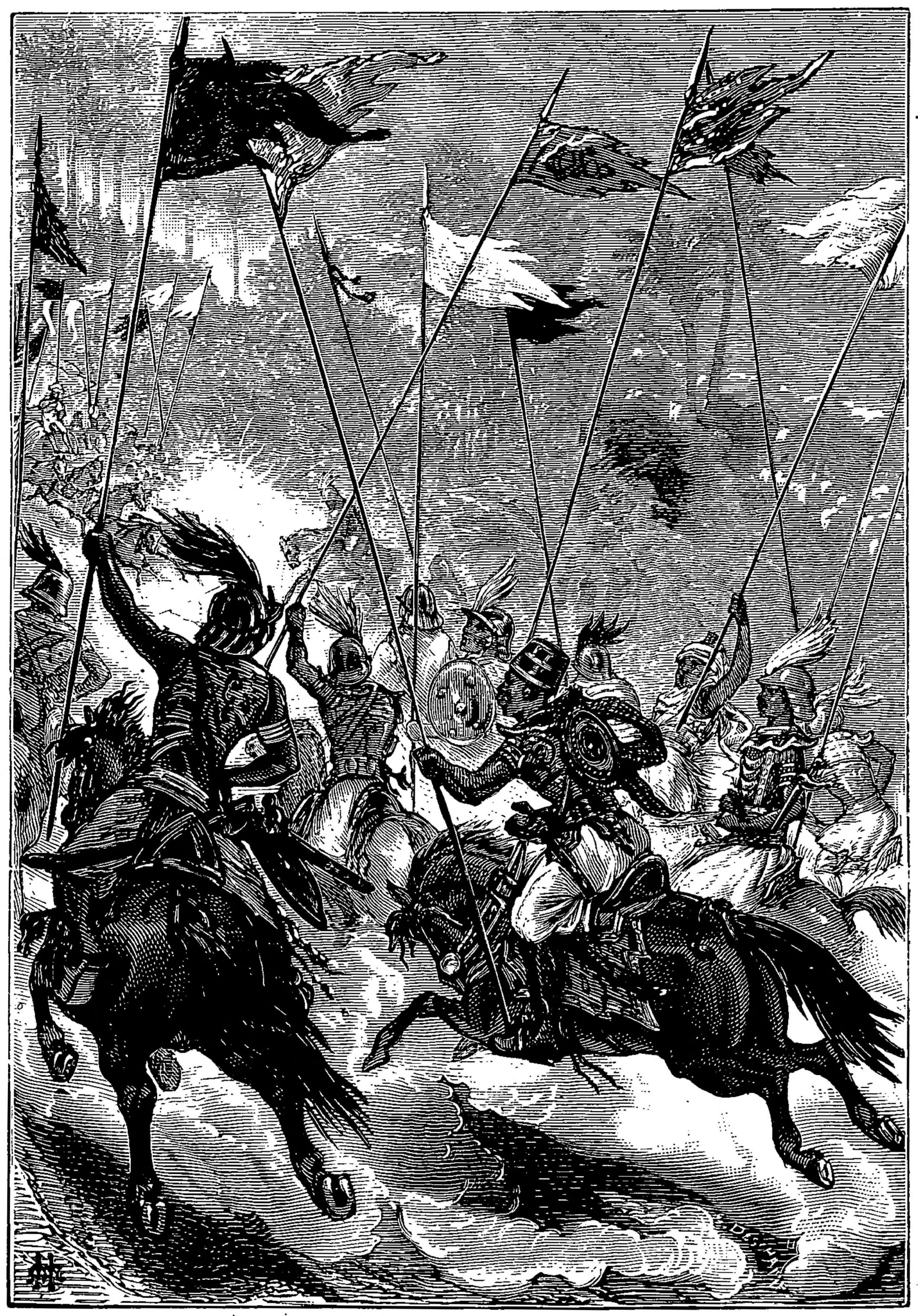
Javanese dragoons from Pekalongan on the way to Surakarta, 1866

In the 17th century, Mataram Sultanate had replaced Demak and previous hegemon Majapahit, as the most powerful kingdom in Java. The reign of able and ambitious Sultan Agung of Mataram marked the apogee of Javanese Mataram martial power. The Sultan launched a series of military expeditions against other polities in Java, such as Pajang, Surabaya, Priangan, and went further by attacking the Dutch East India Company (VOC) fortress in the Siege of Batavia (1628–29).

=== Aceh Sultanate ===
Aceh was one of the earliest Muslim states in the Indonesian archipelago, and they had the ambition to spread Islam as well as their political influence in northern parts of Sumatra. The Sultanate was founded by Ali Mughayat Syah, who began campaigns to extend his control over northern Sumatra in 1520. His conquests included Deli, Pedir, and Pasai, and he attacked Aru. His son Alauddin al-Kahar (d. 1571) extended the domains farther south into Sumatra, but was less successful in his attempts to gain a foothold across the strait, though he made several attacks on both Johor and Malacca, with the support along with men and firearms from Suleiman the Magnificent's Ottoman Empire. The Aceh sultanate has formed a military alliance with the Ottoman Empire, that sent a relief force of 15 Xebecs.

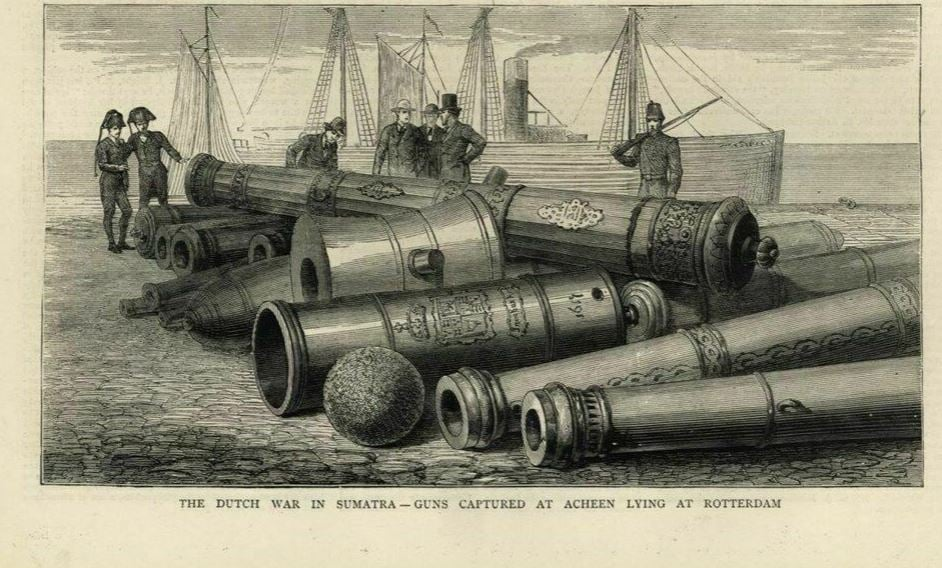
Captured Acehnese and Ottoman guns at Rotterdam, after the Dutch conquest of Aceh. The Aceh Sultanate and the Ottoman Empire have cooperated militarily as early as the 16th century.

Aceh's military ambition reach its peak during the reign of Iskandar Muda. He extended the Sultanate's control over most of Sumatra. He also conquered Pahang, a tin-producing region of the Malayan Peninsula. The strength of his formidable fleet was brought to an end with a disastrous campaign against Malacca in 1629, when the combined Portuguese and Johor forces managed to destroy all his ships and 19,000 troops according to Portuguese account. Aceh forces was not destroyed, however, as Aceh was able to conquer Kedah within the same year and taking many of its citizens to Aceh.

In 1871, the Anglo-Dutch Treaty of Sumatra allowed for Dutch control throughout Sumatra in exchange for concessions in the Gold Coast and equal trading rights in northern Aceh. The treaty was tantamount to a declaration of war on Aceh, and the Aceh War followed soon after in 1873. In 1874 the Sultan abandoned the capital, withdrawing to the hills, while the Dutch announced the annexation of Aceh into Dutch East Indies colonial state.

== European colonial state ==
Started during the Age of Discovery in the 16th century, the European kingdoms and empires began to establish themselves in Southeast Asia. From Portuguese, Spanish, British to the Dutch, each of them involved in some fierce contests, during the age of European colonialism, to rule Indonesian archipelago. Because of the European's advance military technology, such as gunpowder technology in canons and muskets, many kingdoms and polities in Indonesian archipelago were conquered and subjugated by European power.

=== Dutch East India Company ===
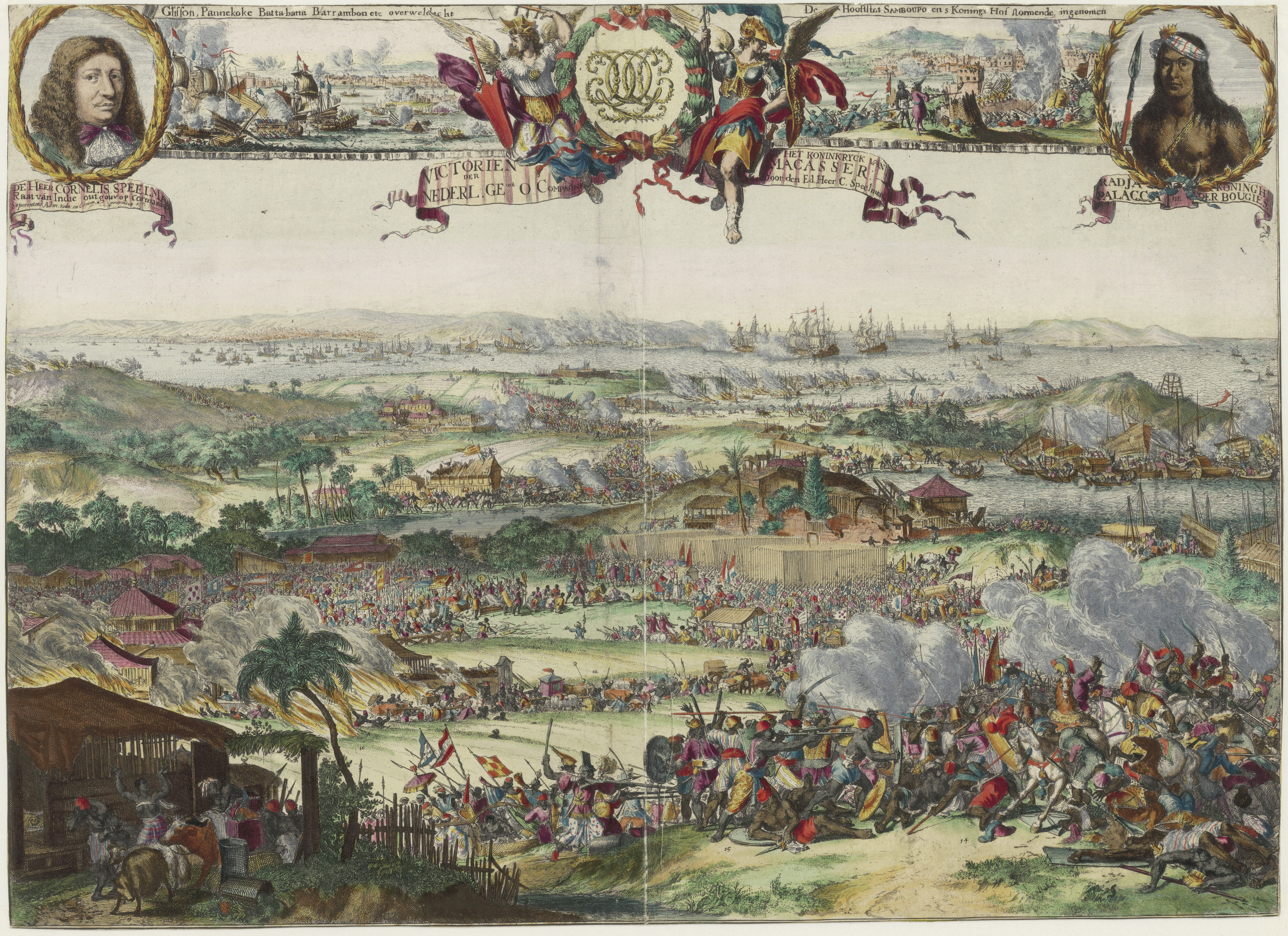
Depiction of the Dutch East India Company's conquest of Makassar by Speelman in 1666 to 1669

The Dutch East India Company (VOC) was the first multinational corporation in the world It was a powerful company, possessing quasi-governmental powers, including the ability to form military units or militias, wage war, imprison and execute convicts, negotiate treaties, strike its own coins, and establish colonies.

The Company in particular, was extremely successful on conquering local Indonesian polities, mostly contributed from European superiority on weaponry and military technology. Start by subjugated Ternate Sultanate in Maluku, wrestled former Portuguese ports by conquering Amboina and Banda islands, acquired port of Jayakarta from Banten Sultanate as they were establishing their headquarter in Batavia (now Jakarta), and the conquest of Makassar in 1669. They went further by weakening the Sultanate of Mataram, and conquered most parts of Java, except the interior of Vorstenlanden Mataram and Banten.

By 1800, the company was declared bankrupt and the Dutch nationalised VOC assets and creating the colonial state of Dutch East Indies.

=== Dutch East Indies ===
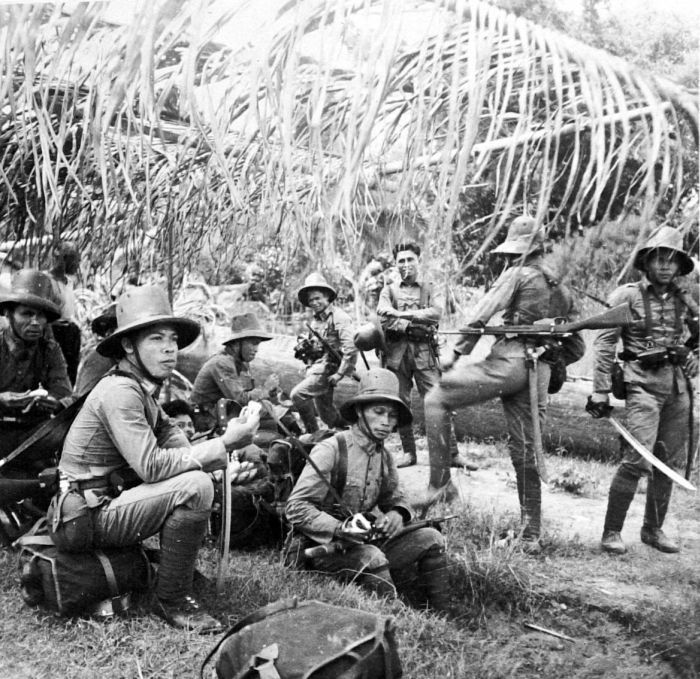
Indigenous troops of the Royal Netherlands East Indies Army, 1938

The colonial state of Dutch East Indies expanded further as they launched a series of conquest against native kingdoms and sultanates started in the early 19th century to the early 20th century.

The Royal Netherlands East Indies Army or the Koninklijk Nederlands Indisch Leger (KNIL) was formed on 10 March 1830. It was not part of the Royal Netherlands Army, but a separate military arm specifically formed for service in the Netherlands East Indies. Its establishment coincided with the Dutch ambition to expand colonial rule from the 17th century area of control to the far larger territories comprising the Dutch East Indies seventy years later.

The KNIL was involved in many campaigns against indigenous polities and militias in the Indonesian archipelago including the Padri War (1821–1845), the Java War (1825–1830), crushing the resistance of Bali in 1849, and the prolonged Aceh War (1873–1904). In 1894, Lombok and Karangasem were annexed. Bali was finally taken under full control through the campaign in 1906 and the final campaign in 1908.

Throughout the nineteenth and early twentieth centuries, the KNIL launched some conquests on the Indonesian archipelago, and after 1904 the Netherlands East Indies were considered pacified, with no large-scale armed opposition to the Dutch rule. By 1920 the Dutch colonial state has integrated most of Indonesian archipelago within its territory. The Dutch East Indies has become the most precious colony for the Dutch crown.

== World War II ==
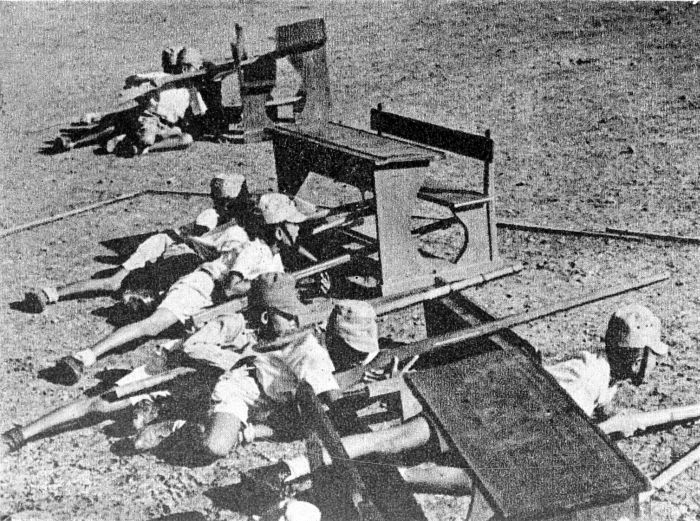
Indonesian youth being trained by the Imperial Japanese Army during World War II

The Dutch colonial state was brought into an abrupt end when the Empire of Japan launched fast and systematic attacks in 1942. The Japanese occupation in Indonesia was part of larger war of the Pacific theatre during World War II. To gain popular support and mobilise Indonesian people in their war effort against the Western Allied force, Japanese occupation forces encouraged Indonesian nationalistic movements and recruiting Indonesian nationalist leaders; Sukarno, Hatta, Ki Hajar Dewantara and Kyai Haji Mas Mansyur to rally the people support for mobilisation centre Putera (Indonesian: Pusat Tenaga Rakyat) on 16 April 1943, replaced with Jawa Hokokai on 1 March 1944. Some of these mobilised populations were sent to forced labour as romusha.

Japanese military also provided Indonesian youth with military trainings and weapons, including the formation of volunteer army called PETA (Pembela Tanah Air – Defenders of the Homeland). The Japanese military trainings for Indonesian youth originally was meant to rally the local's support for the collapsing power of Empire of Japan, but later it has become the significant resource for Republic of Indonesia during Indonesian National Revolution in 1945 to 1949, and also led to the formation of the Indonesian National Armed Forces in 1945.

== Republic of Indonesia ==
=== War of independence ===
Just two days after Japanese Emperor Hirohito announced the surrender of the Empire of Japan to the Allied force, the Indonesian Republic was proclaimed by Sukarno and Hatta in Jakarta on 17 August 1945. At first, The Indonesian Army started out as BKR (Badan Keamanan Rakjat – People's Security Bureau), which was formed on 29 August 1945, it was created more as a civil defence force than an army.

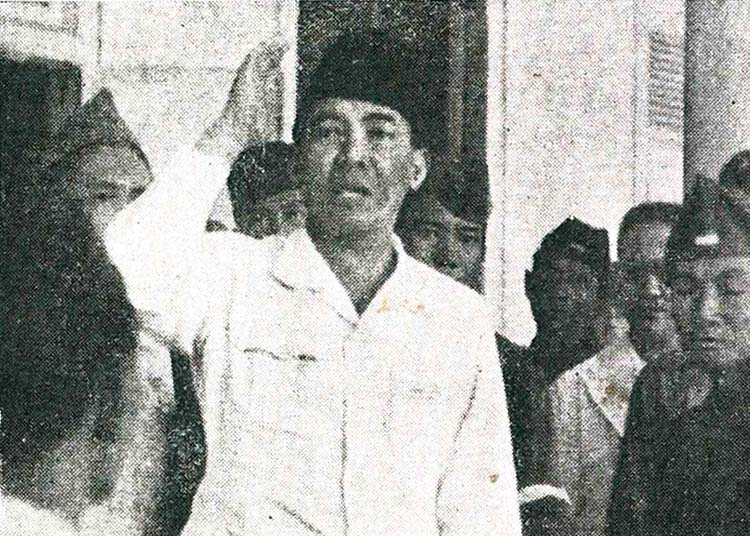
Sukarno speaks with Indonesian soldiers prior to the Battle of Surabaya. The battle saw the birth of the Tentara Keamanan Rakyat, a predecessor of the Indonesian National Armed Forces.

However, the Dutch with the help of British forces tried to reestablish the colonial state of Dutch East Indies. Indonesian nationalist republicans fought hard to protect their newly declared independence. The fierce Battle of Surabaya on October to November 1945 saw the birth of Tentara Keamanan Rakyat (TKR – People's Security Army) – predecessor to the current Indonesian National Armed Forces – on 5 October 1945; this was a move taken to formalise, unite, and organise the splintered pockets of independent troopers ('laskar') across Indonesia, ensuing a more professional military approach, to contend with the Netherlands and the Allied invasion forces.

In January 1946, TRI (Tentara Republik Indonesia – Republic of Indonesia Army) was formed, in a further step to professionalise the army and increase its ability to engage systematically. In June 1947 then, TRI changed its name to TNI (Tentara Nasional Indonesia – Indonesian National Armed Forces) which is a merger between the TRI with the independent paramilitary people's struggle organizations (laskar) across the young republic.

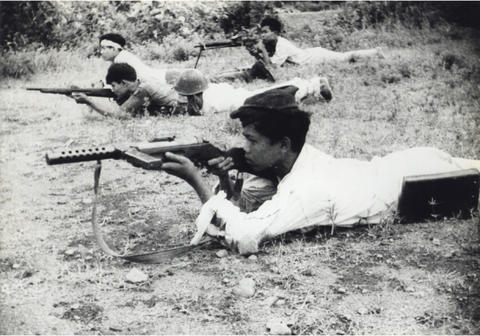
Indonesian youths are practicing scouting the enemy and using weapons, 1946.

On 20 July 1947, the Dutch launched a major military offensive called Operatie Product, with the intent of conquering the Republic. Claiming violations of the Linggajati Agreement, the Dutch described the campaign as politionele acties (Police Actions) to restore law and order. This used to be the task of the KNIL. However, at the time the majority of the Dutch troops in Indonesia belonged to the Royal Netherlands Army.

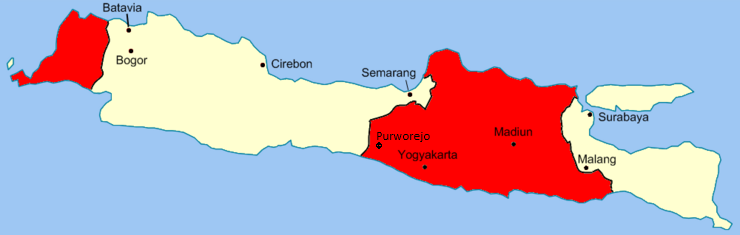
A map of Java following the Renville Agreement in January 1948, with Republican held areas in red, and Dutch held areas in white

The United Nations Security Council brokered the Renville Agreement in an attempt to rectify the collapsed Linggarjati Agreement. The agreement was ratified in January 1948 and recognised a cease-fire along the so-called 'Van Mook line'; which connected the most advanced Dutch positions. Many Republican positions, however, were still held behind the Dutch lines. In February 1948 the Siliwangi Division (35,000 men) of the Republican Army, led by Nasution, marched from West Java to Central Java; the relocation was intended to ease internal Republican tensions involving the Division in the Surakarta area. The Battalion, however, clashed with Dutch troops while crossing Mount Slamet, and the Dutch believed it was part of a systematic troop movement across the Renville Line.

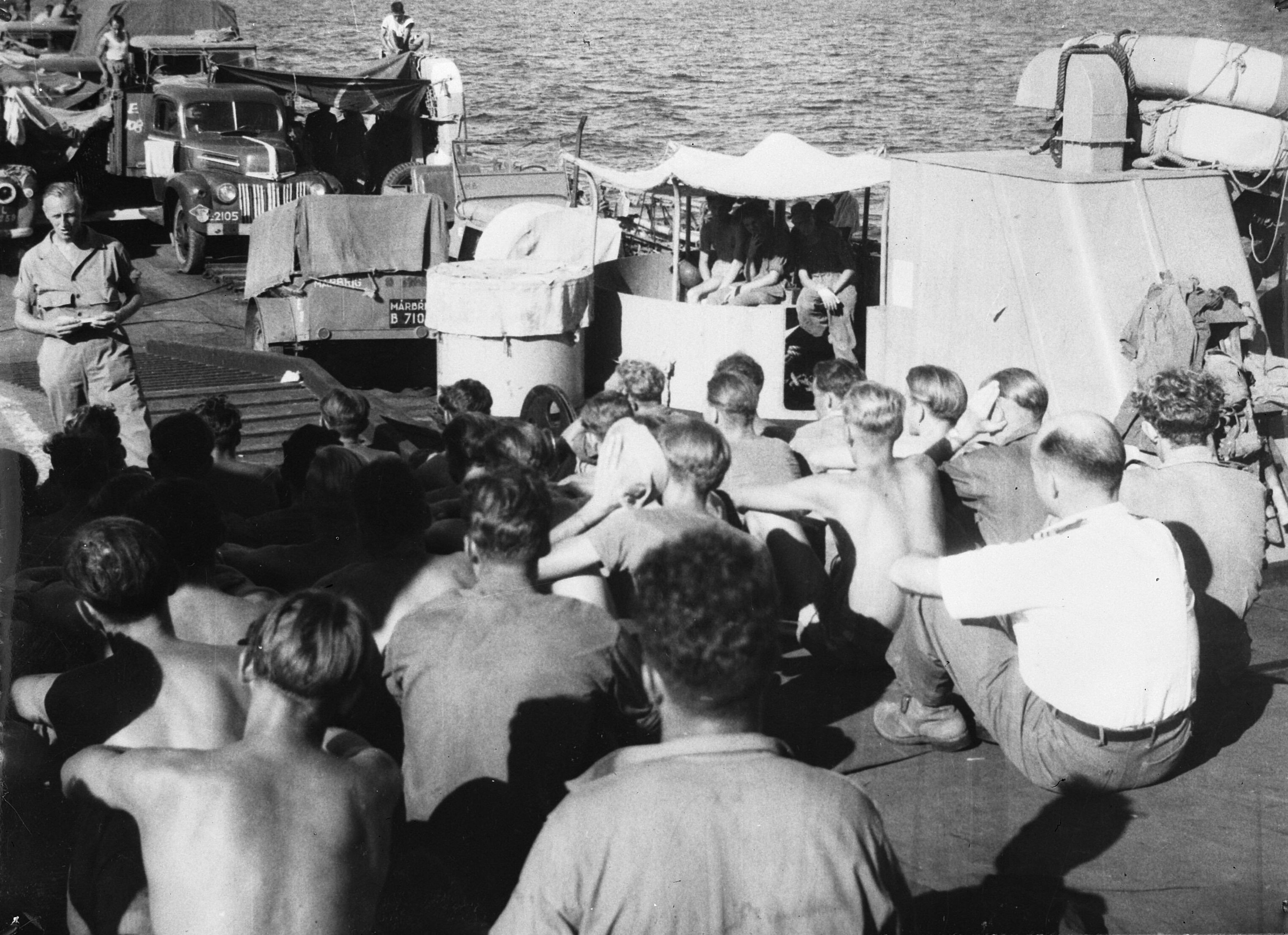
Dutch forces during Operation Kraai, a Dutch military offensive against Republican forces

The Dutch launched a military offensive on 19 December 1948 called Operatie Kraai (Operation Crow). By the following day it had conquered the city of Yogyakarta, the temporary Republican capital. By the end of December, all major Republican held cities in Java and Sumatra were in Dutch hands. The Republican president, vice-president, and all but six Republic of Indonesia ministers were captured by Dutch troops and exiled on Bangka Island off the east coast of Sumatra. In areas surrounding Yogyakarta and Surakarta, Republican forces refused to surrender and continued to wage a guerrilla war under the leadership of Republican military chief of staff General Sudirman who had escaped the Dutch offensives. An emergency Republican government, the Pemerintahan Darurat Republik Indonesia (PDRI), was established in Bukittinggi, West Sumatra.

Although Dutch forces conquered the towns and cities in Republican heartlands on Java and Sumatra, they could not control villages and the countryside. Republican troops and militia led by Lt. Colonel (later President) Suharto attacked Dutch positions in Yogyakarta at dawn on 1 March 1949. The Dutch were expelled from the city for six hours but reinforcements were brought in from the nearby cities of Ambarawa and Semarang that afternoon. Indonesian fighters retreated at 12:00 pm and the Dutch re-entered the city. The Indonesian attack, later known in Indonesia as Serangan Oemoem (new spelling: Serangan Umum '1 March General Offensive'). A similar attack against Dutch troops in Surakarta was led by Lt. Col. Slamet Riyadi on 7 August the same year.

The resilience of Indonesian Republican resistance and active international diplomacy set world opinion against the Dutch. The United States pushed the Netherlands government into negotiations. The Dutch–Indonesian Round Table Conference was held in The Hague from 23 August 1949 to 2 November 1949 between the Republic, the Netherlands, and the Dutch-created federal states. The Netherlands agreed to recognise Indonesian sovereignty over a new federal state known as the 'United States of Indonesia' (RUSI). It would include all the territory of the former Dutch East Indies with the exception of Netherlands New Guinea; which was retained by the Netherlands until further negotiations with Indonesia. Sovereignty was formally transferred on 27 December 1949.

=== Securing the Republic ===
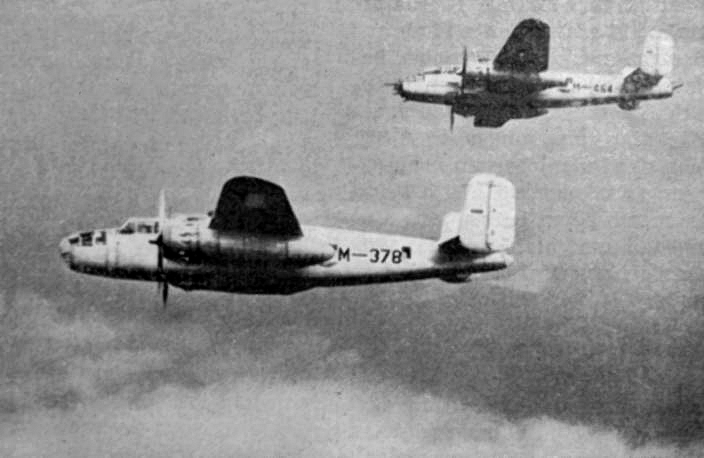
B-25 Mitchell bombers of the Indonesian Air Force. During the 1950s, the bombers were used to combat regional rebellions throughout the country.

In the period between the 1949 to 1965, Indonesian national unity faced some dire ordeals, as Indonesian Central Government in Jakarta faced numerous regional rebellions and separatist movements that appeared almost simultaneously. They had established the alternative government and declared separate independent states within the Republic of Indonesia. The Indonesian Islamic state appeared in 1949, Republic of South Maluku was declared in 1950, while the Revolutionary Government of the Republic of Indonesia and Permesta rebellions appeared in the same period between 1957 and 1958.

During the Indonesian National Revolution, Kartosuwirjo founded his own band of freedom fighters in West Java, called Hizbullah and Sabilillah. As a protest toward the Renville Agreement signed by Indonesian leaders in 1948, which ceded West Java to the Dutch, Kartosuwirjo proclaimed a Darul Islam ("Islamic State") in West Java on 7 August 1949. Darul Islam did not disband itself after the transfer of sovereignty in 1949, resulting in a clash with the government of the Indonesian Republic.

On 25 April 1950, the Republic of South Maluku (RMS) was declared and promptly quashed by Indonesian Republic. The RMS on Ambon was defeated by Indonesian forces in November 1950. The defeat on Ambon resulted in the flight of the self-declared RMS government to the island of Seram, where guerrilla clashes would take place for more than a decade.

In 1951, rebels in South Sulawesi led by army deserter Abdul Kahar Muzakkar joined the Darul Islam movement. On 20 September 1953, Daud Beureu'eh declared that Aceh was part of the Islamic State of Indonesia (Negara Islam Indonesia) under the leadership of Kartosuwirjo. In 1957, it was estimated that the Darul Islam controlled one-third of West Java and more than 90% of South Sulawesi and Aceh provinces. The movement had 15,000 armed guerrillas operating under the banner of Tentara Islam Indonesia (Indonesian Islamic Army).

Indonesian Republic launched some crackdown operations against the Islamist state. Smaller Darul Islam bands operating in Central Java under Amir Fatah was crushed by Colonel Ahmad Yani's Banteng Raiders in 1954–1957. Amir Fatah was killed in 1954, while Ibnu Hadjar was eventually executed in 1962.

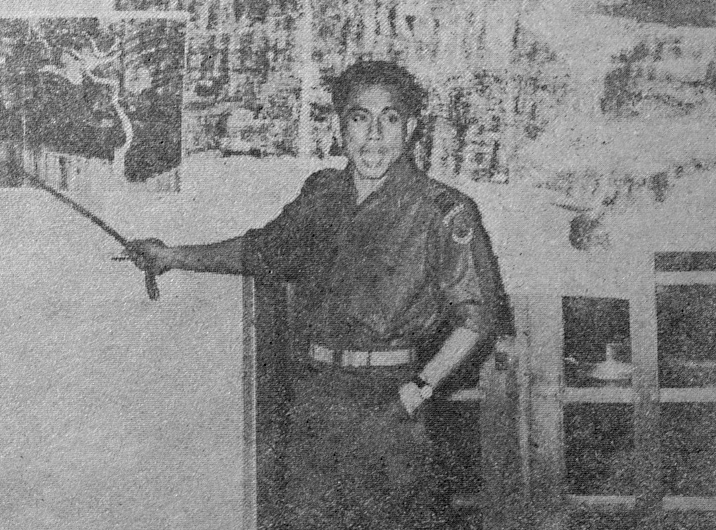
Col. Ahmad Yani leading a briefing prior to Operation 17 August, a military operation directed against the Revolutionary Government of the Republic of Indonesia

On 2 March 1957, the Permesta rebellion was declared by civil and military leaders of East Indonesia, centred in Manado. The movement was led by Colonel Ventje Sumual. In 1958, the Revolutionary Government of the Republic of Indonesia (Indonesian: Pemerintah Revolusioner Republik Indonesia/PRRI) set up an alternative government in Sumatra to oppose the Indonesian Central Government. On 17 February 1958 the Permesta rebels joined forces with the Revolutionary Government of the Republic of Indonesia rebels based in Sumatra who had declared a revolutionary government two days earlier.

Darul Islam forces in South Kalimantan under Ibnu Hadjar were forced to surrender in 1959. Three years of negotiations (1959–1962) led to a peace agreement that ended the conflict in Aceh, in which Aceh was restored as an autonomous province with special rights for Islamic law. Introduction of effective "fence-of-legs" method of encircling rebel mountain hideouts in 1959 succeeded in breaking the strong rebel grip over West Java's rural areas.

The Central Government launched military operations against PRRI headquarter in Central Sumatra. General Nasution, who was leading the government forces, launched Operasi Pemanggilan Kembali (Operation Call Back) at the end of 1960 to take advantage of internal rifts within the PRRI. The main objective of which was to persuade the army officers supporting the PRRI to surrender themselves. By 1961 PRRI rebellion surrendered. Following successful Central Government attacks on the PRRI based in Sumatra, the conflict swung to the east where the Permesta rebels were based. Central Government forces were able to capture the Permesta capital of Manado at the conclusion of June 1958. However, the Permesta rebels continued their resistance, fighting a guerrilla campaign against central government troops until the last remnants surrendered and were given an amnesty in 1961.

In June 1962, Kartosuwirjo, the leader of Darul Islam, was captured on his hideout of Mount Geber near Garut. In captivity, Kartosuwirjo issued order for all his followers to surrender, after which he was quickly tried and executed. The last Darul Islam band in West Java surrendered in August 1962. Successive military operations also crushed the Darul Islam in South Sulawesi.

RMS armed struggle continued on the island of Seram until defeated in December 1963. In February 1965, Darul Islam's leader Kahar Muzakkar was killed in a military ambush in the interior of Southeast Sulawesi province, ending the Darul Islam insurgency in Indonesia. The fall of RMS position in Maluku has led to the formation of RMS government in exile in the Netherlands in 1966.

=== Regional ambition ===
In the early 1960s, Indonesia has succeeded in maintaining its national unity against regional rebellions, and shifted their attention to Dutch-held West New Guinea. Indonesia argued that as a successor state of Dutch East Indies, West Papua is theirs. Feeling confidence, Indonesia has won Soviet Union's supports to modernise their weapons and military equipment, and soon would embarked on regional military campaigns, first against Dutch to wrestle West New Guinea, then against the formation of Malaysia, and later in the 1970s against Portuguese Timor.

In July 1959, the Indonesian government adopted a policy of confrontation against the Dutch to claim West New Guinea and increased military incursions into the island. Sukarno also developed closer relations with the Soviet Union, which shared Indonesia's anti-colonial outlook. Later that year, the Soviet government decided to supply the warships and other military hardware directly to the Indonesians.

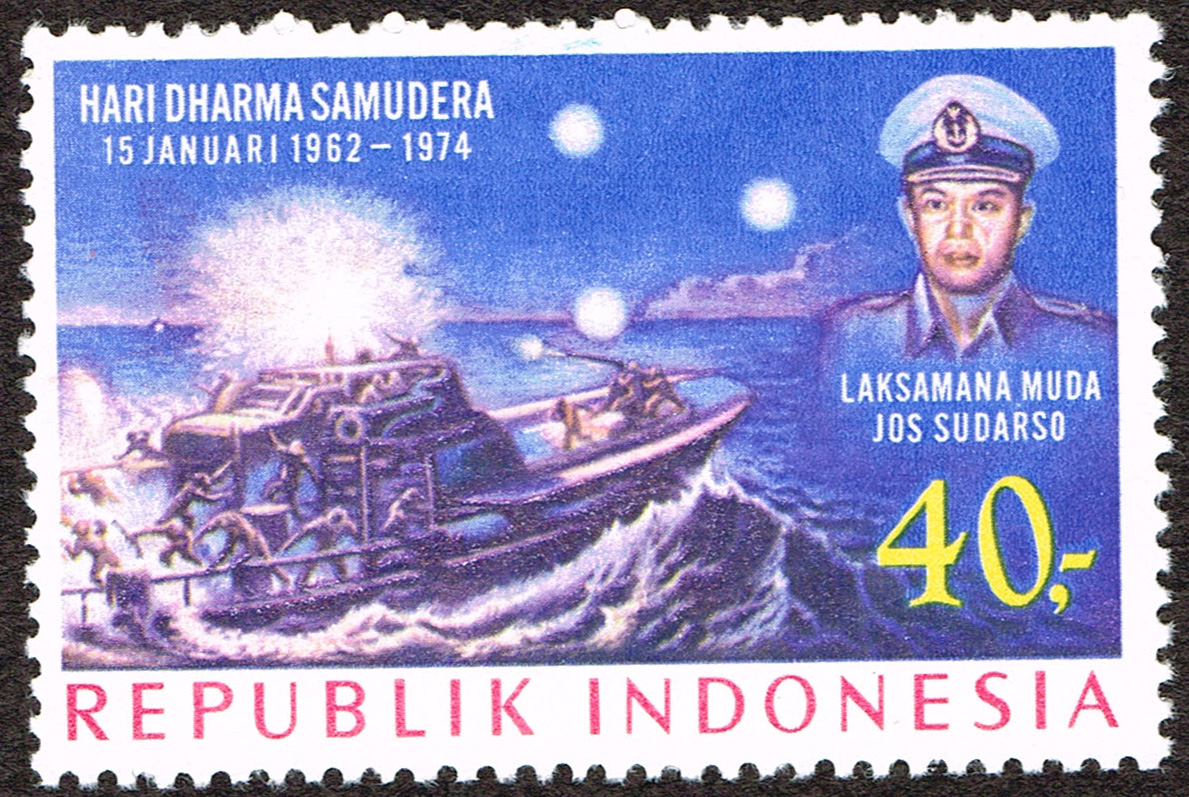
Indonesian postage stamp commemorating Yos Sudarso, commander of the West New Guinea campaign

Between 1960 and 1962, Indonesia continued its policy of confrontation against the Netherlands for the control of West New Guinea, combining diplomatic, political, and economic pressure with limited military force. The final stage of the Indonesian Confrontation also involved a planned military invasion of the territory. The Indonesians also secured military weapons and political support from the Soviet Union, which induced the United States to intervene in the conflict as a third-party mediator between Indonesia and the Netherlands. Throughout 1960, Indonesian armed forces launched several infiltrations into West New Guinea. On 19 December 1961 Indonesian President Sukarno decreed the establishment of the Operation Trikora or Tri Komando Rakyat with the objective of 'liberating' West New Guinea by 1 January 1963. During the ensuing Vlakke Hoek incident, one of Indonesian torpedo boats was sunk while the remaining two boats were forced to retreat. Many Indonesian crew members and embarked marines being killed and 55 survivors taken prisoner. Among the casualties was Commodore Yos Sudarso, the deputy chief of the Indonesian Navy Staff.

On 24 June 1962, four Indonesian Air Force C-130 Hercules jets dropped 213 paratroopers near Merauke. Throughout the year, a total of 1,200 Indonesian paratroopers and 340 naval infiltrators landed in West New Guinea. By mid-1962, the Indonesian military had begun preparations to launch a full-scale invasion of Dutch New Guinea known as Operation Jayawijaya around August 1962. However, a ceasefire agreement between the Dutch and Indonesians, which facilitated the transfer of West New Guinea to Indonesia control by 1963, was signed on 15 August. As a result, the Indonesian military cancelled Operation Jayawijaya on 17 August 1962. Following the Act of Free Choice plebiscite in 1969, West Papua was formally integrated into the Republic of Indonesia.

An Australian Broadcasting Corporation report from 1966, discussing the Indonesian political context of Konfrontasi

In 1963, Indonesia opposed the British decolonisation initiative on the formation of Malaysia, arguing that it was the western imperialist move to block Indonesian influence. This led to an undeclared war popularly called Konfrontasi that took place between 1963 and 1966. This tension was marked by the infiltration of Indonesian forces into Northern Borneo. The conflict lasted nearly four years; however, following General Suharto's replacement of Sukarno, Indonesian interest in pursuing the war with Malaysia declined, and combat eased. Peace negotiations were initiated during May 1966 before a final peace agreement was ratified on 11 August 1966.

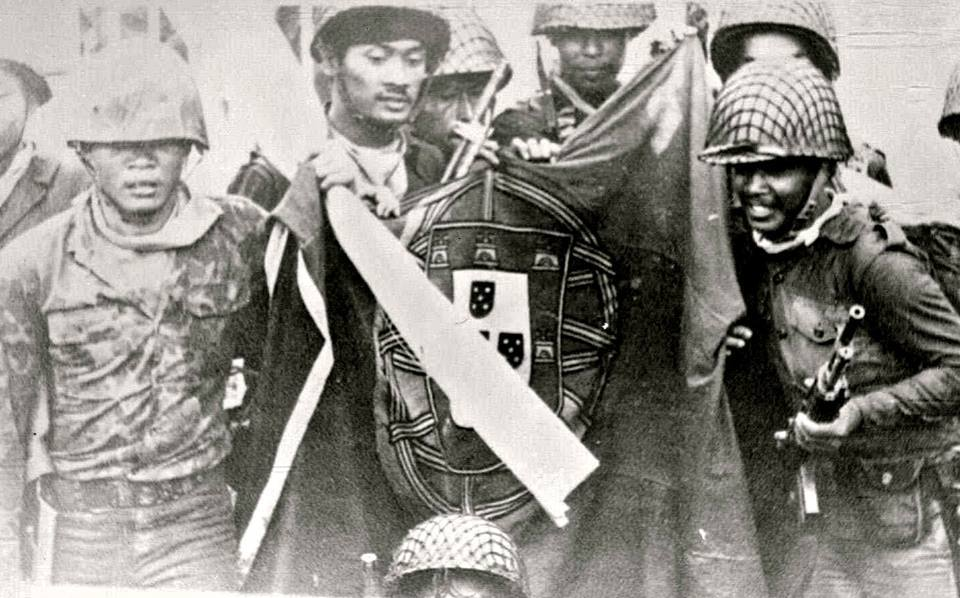
Indonesian forces in Batugade, East Timor in November 1975 with a captured Portuguese flag

On 7 December 1975, Indonesian forces invaded East Timor under the pretext of anti-colonialism. Operasi Seroja (Operation Lotus) was the largest military operation ever carried out by Indonesia. Following a naval bombardment of Dili, Indonesian seaborne troops landed in the city while simultaneously paratroopers descended. 641 Indonesian paratroopers jumped into Dili, where they engaged in six-hours combat with FALINTIL gunmen. Indonesia would rule East Timor as its province for 24 years until 1999, when East Timorese vote for independence from Indonesia.

=== Battling separatism ===
By the 1970s, Indonesia was facing two main separatist movements on both edges of the archipelagic realm; a separatist movement in Aceh on the western front, and a small scale separatist movement in Papua on the eastern front.

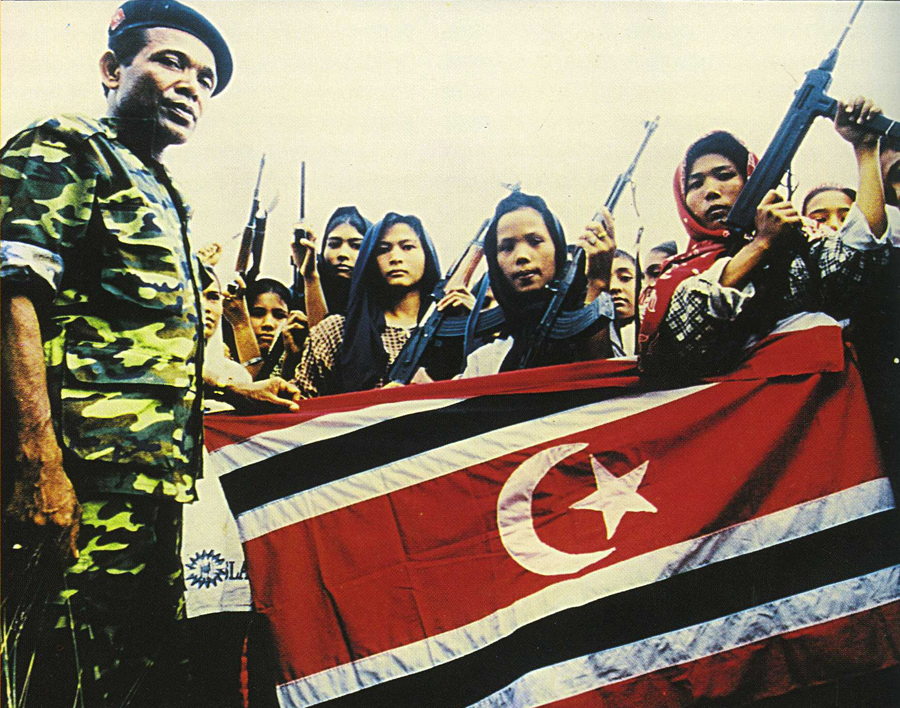
Insurgents of the Free Aceh Movement during the insurgency in Aceh, 1999. The insurgency lasted from 1976 to 2005.

Between 1976 and 2005 in Aceh, there was an insurgency waged by the Free Aceh Movement (GAM) aspired for the province to be independent from Indonesia. Previously in the 1950s, Aceh has been a part of similar separatism aspiration, the Darul Islam. On 4 December 1976 Hasan di Tiro, the leader of Free Aceh Movement, declared Acehnese independence. In 1985, di Tiro secured Libyan support for GAM—taking advantage of Muammar Gaddafi's policy of supporting nationalist rebellions. Incidents began in 1989 after the return of the Acehnese trainees from Libya. Operations by GAM included weapons raiding, attacks against police and military posts, arsons and targeted assassinations of police and military personnel, government informants and other individuals.

The GAM's actions led the Indonesian government to institute repressive measures. The period between 1989 and 1998 became known as the "Military Operation Area" or Daerah Operasi Militer (DOM) era as the Indonesian military stepped up its counter-insurgency measures. This measure, although tactically successful in destroying GAM as a guerrilla force, alienated the local Acehnese. Shortly the GAM re-establish itself when Indonesian military was almost totally withdrawn from Aceh by order of president Habibie in late 1998. Destruction caused by the armed conflicts and 2004 Indian Ocean earthquake brought a peace deal and an end to the insurgency. The resulting peace agreement was signed on 15 August 2005. Under the agreement, Aceh would receive special autonomy under the Republic of Indonesia, and non-Aceh native government troops would be withdrawn from the province in exchange for GAM's disarmament. As part of the agreement, the European Union dispatched 300 monitors. Their mission expired on 15 December 2006, following local elections.

In eastern front, despite the official international recognition of West New Guinea absorption into Indonesia in 1969, there is some residual problems that still haunting the province up until this day. This is mostly because previously the Netherlands New Guinea has promoted Papuan nationalism among native population back in the 1950s that inspired their desire to establishing an independence state separated from Indonesia. There is an ongoing low-level conflict between the Indonesian Government and portions of the indigenous populations of West Papua in the Indonesian provinces of Papua and West Papua. One of the separatist group, the Free Papua Movement (OPM), a militant Papuan-independence organisation, has conducted a low-level guerrilla war against the Indonesian state, targeting the Indonesian military and police, as well as engaging in the kidnapping and killings of both Indonesians including native Papuans and foreigners. Up until this day, most of the West Papuan insurgency were considered as low-level security disturbances and dealt by deploying Indonesian police and military force.

=== War against terror ===
After the crackdown on Darul Islam in 1962 and the death of most of its leaders in 1965, the Islamist aspiration in Indonesia were seems to be repressed, but not completely eradicated. During and after the rule of Suharto, numbers of Islamist movement has been aspired to establish Islamic state based on sharia and toppled the secular Republican government of Indonesia. Among these organisation, the most notable is Jemaah Islamiyah Islamist terrorist group, that orchestrated series of terror attacks in Indonesia, such as 2000 Christmas Eve bombings, 2002 Bali bombings, 2003 Marriott Hotel bombing, 2004 Australian Embassy bombings, 2005 Bali bombings and 2009 Jakarta bombings. Since then Indonesian Police and authority has been successfully crack down the terrorist-cells and arrested their leaders and masterminds.

=== International engagements ===
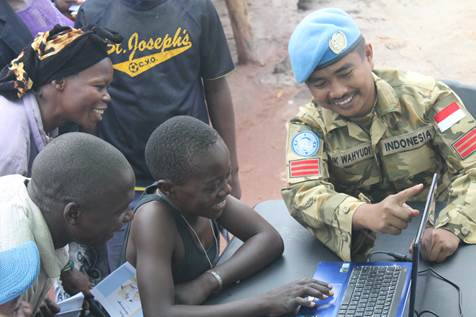
An Indonesian United Nations peacekeeper teaching a child from Dungu, Democratic Republic of the Congo how to use a laptop

Since 1956, Indonesia has been participating in United Nations' peacekeepers force drawn from the Indonesian military called Garuda Contingent. It has been deployed to three continents. The Garuda Contingent was first deployed to Egypt and Israel in November 1956 as part of the United Nations Emergency Force. The next two contingents were sent to the Congo. The first contingent consisted of 1,074 troops, served from September 1960 to May 1961. The second contingent to the Congo consisted of 3,457 troops, served from 1962 to 1963 and saw one casualty.

The Garuda Contingent's fourth and fifth deployments were to Vietnam in 1973 and 1974, towards the end of the Vietnam War. This was followed by a sixth deployment to Egypt after the Yom Kippur War under the command of Colonel Rudini. The Garuda Contingent later returned to Vietnam and Egypt for a seventh and eighth deployment, respectively.

After an eight-year hiatus, the Garuda Contingent deployed as part of the United Nations Iran–Iraq Military Observer Group in 1988, followed by the mission to Somalia and Cambodia in 1992, Mozambique in 1994, Bosnia in 1995, Congo in 2003, and Lebanon in the 2010.

As of 30 June 2023, the United Nations recorded that 42 Indonesian troops serving in the United Nations had been killed for various reasons.

=== Military role in modern Indonesia ===
Throughout the history of modern Indonesia, military has maintained an important role in political and social affairs. Many Indonesian prominent figures have military backgrounds. Since the rise of Suharto regime in 1965, the armed forces has been actively involved on supporting the regime, which was marked by authoritarian rule, political repression, and widespread human rights abuses. The military played a key role in suppressing dissent and maintaining Suharto's grip on power through fear and intimidation. However, after the fall of Suharto regime in 1998, there were some calls to limit the military role in national politics. With the inauguration of the newly elected national parliament in October 2004, the military no longer has a formal political role, although it retains important influence.

== See also ==
- Puputan
- History of Indonesia
- Foreign relations of Indonesia
