= Language B =

Language B is a postulated Austronesian language attested on the Telaga Batu inscription and Kota Kapur inscription from the time of Sriwijaya, otherwise written in Old Malay (Language A). The language was analyzed in detail by Louis-Charles Damais.
