= Talang Tuo inscription =

7th-century Srivijaya inscription

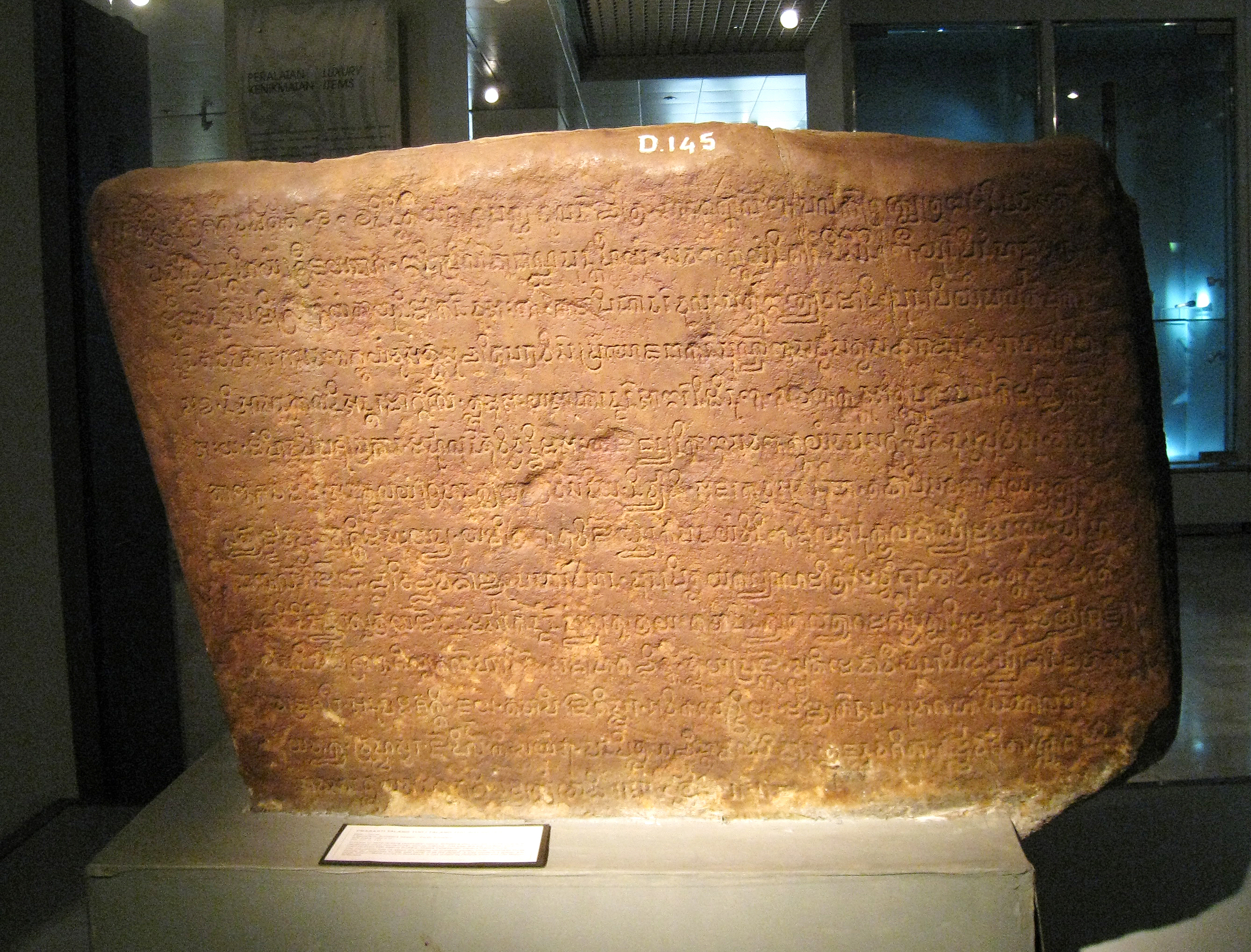
- Talang Tuo inscription, displayed at National Museum of Indonesia, Jakarta
- Material: Stone
- Size: 50 cm × 80 cm
- Writing: Pallava script in Old Malay
- Created: 606 Saka (corresponds to 23 March 684)
- Discovered: Bukit Seguntang near Palembang, Indonesia
- Present location: National Museum of Indonesia, Jakarta
- Registration: D.145

The Talang Tuo inscription is a 7th-century Srivijaya inscription discovered by Louis Constant Westenenk on 17 November 1920, on the foot of Bukit Seguntang near Palembang.

This inscription tells about the establishment of the bountiful Śrīksetra park awarded by Sri Jayanasa the king of Srivijaya, for the well being of all creatures.

The inscription was discovered in good condition with clearly inscribed scripts. Its size is 50 cm × 80 cm. It is a stone block and it is dated from 606 Saka (corresponds to 23 March 684), written Pallava script in Old Malay. The inscription consists of 14 lines. Van Ronkel and Bosch are the first scholars who translated the inscription. Their work was published in Acta Orientalia. Since 1920, the inscription has been stored in National Museum of Indonesia, Jakarta, under inventory number D.145.

== Content ==
The writings on the Talang Tuo inscription:

Original Script
1	swasti śrī śakawarṣātīta 606 ding dwitīya śuklapakṣa wulan caitra sana tatkalaña parlak śrī ksetra ini niparwuat
2	parwānda punta hiyang śrī jayanāga. ini pranidhānānda punta hiyang sawañakña yang nitanang di sini niyur pinang hanāu ru(-)
3	mwiya dnan samiśrāña yang kāyu nimākan wūahna, tathāpi. hāur wuluh pattum ityevamadi, punarapi yang parlak wukan
4	dṅan tawad talāga sawaña yang wuatña sucarita parāwis prayojanākan punyāña sarwwa satwa sacā(?) rācara, waropā yaña tmu
5	sukha di āsannakāla di antara mārgga lai. tmu muaḥ ya āhāra dṅan āir niminumña sawañakña wuatña huma parlak mañcak mu(-)
6	ah ya manghidupi paśuprakāra. marhulun tuwi wṛddhi muaḥ ya jāṅan ya niknāi sawañakña yang upasargga. pīdanna swapnawighna. warang wua(-)
7	tāña kathamapi. anukūla yang graha nakṣatra parāwis di ya. nirwyadhi ajara kawuatanāna. tathāpi sawañakña yang bhṛtyāna.
8	satyārjjawa dṛdhabhakti muaḥ ya dya. yang mitrāña tuwi jāna ya kapata yang winiña mulang anukūla bharyyā muaḥ ya waram sthā.
9	nāña lāgi jānan cūri ucca wadhāña paradāra di sāna. punarapi tmu ya kalyānamitra marwwanun wodhicitta dṅan mattri
10	udhāni di dang hyang ratnatraya jānan marsārak dṅan dang hyang ratnatraya. tathāpi nityakāla tyāga marśila ksānti marwwanun wīryya rājin.
11	tāhu di samiśrāna śilpakāla parāwis. samāhita cinta. tmu ya prajñā. smṛti medhāwi. punarapi dhairyyamāṇī mahāsattwa.
12	wajraśarīra. anupamaśakti. jaya. tathāpi jatismara. awikalendriya. mañcak rūpa. subhaga hāsin halap. āde
13	yawakya. wrahmaswara. jadi laki swayambhu puna [ra] pi tmu ya cintāmani nidhāna. tmu janmawaśitā. karmmawaśitā. kleśawaśitā.
14	awasāna tmu ya anuttarābhisamyakṣamwodhi.

=== Translation ===
The translation according to George Cœdès.

On 23 March 684, on that day the park named Śrīksetra was created under the order of Sri Baginda Śrī Jayanāśa. his majesty intention is: May all (plants) planted here, coconut tree, Areca catechu, Arenga pinnata, sagoo, and all kinds of trees, the fruits are edible, as well as haur bamboo, waluh, and pattum, et cetera; and may all other plants with the dams and ponds, and all of good deed that I've gave (contributed) can be enjoyed for the benefit of all creatures; the one that can moved around and ones that can not, and may this would be the best path to achieve happiness. If they were hungry, or need a rest during their journey, may they find foods and drinks. May all the orchard that they have opened be abundance (the harvest). May all kinds of animals that they have kept were fertile, and also their slaves. May the misfortunes would not befell upon them, not being tortured because can not sleep. What ever they done, may all the planets and stars favour their fortunes, and may they be spared from sickness and old age during their efforts. And may all their subjects are loyal and devoted, also may all their friend would not betrayed them, and may their wive are faithful. Moreover, may wherever they were, there will be no thieves, or people that using violence, killers and adulterers. Next to all those (good wishes), may they have a (faithful) friends; may from themselves born the thought of Boddhi and friendship (...) from three Ratnas. And may they always (acted) generous, following the rules, and be patience; may from themselves grew strength, diligence, knowledge of all kinds of arts; may their attention be focused, have knowledge, good memory and intelligence. May they have tenacious thought, with diamond body just like the Mahāsattvas with incomparable power, glorious, and remembering their previous lives, with complete senses, fully (beautiful) formed, happy, smiling, calm, have pleasant voice, the voice of Brahmā. May they be (born as) man, with very existence were (a blessing) because of themselves; may they become the vessel of cintamani sacred stone, have power of (cycle of) births, power upon karma, power upon stains, and may they finally achieved the perfect and grand (spiritual) enlightenment.

=== Old Malay vocabulary ===
The inscription is among the earliest evidence of written archaic Old Malay language. Many words are still recognizable and intelligible with Modern Malay (including Indonesian and Malaysian variants). The most significant differences are found in verbal affixes. While modern Malay and Indonesian use the prefix di- to mark passive, in Old Malay we find ni-. The same holds for the active prefix men- corresponding to Old Malay mar- or ma-. The modern possessive and object suffix -nya corresponds to the Old Malay -na. Old Malay words and their modern Malay and Indonesian counterparts are listed below, followed by their English gloss.

- vulan = bulan = month
- tatkalana = tatkalanya = while, during
- ini = ini = this
- tmu = temu, bertemu = meet
- niparvuat = diperbuat = performed
- savanakna = sebanyaknya = amount of
- nitanam = ditanam = planted
- di sini = di sini = here
- niyur = nyiur = palm tree
- hanau = enau = Arenga plant
- rumvia = rumbia = Arenga fibers
- dngan = dengan = with
- nimakan = dimakan = being eaten
- vuahna = buahnya = fruits
- tathapi = tetapi = but
- rajin = rajin = diligent
- tahu = tahu = to know (knowledge)
- haur = aur = aur (a type of bamboo)
- vuluh = buluh = vines, may also means bamboo
- pattung = betung (a type of bamboo)
- tlaga = telaga = pond, small lake
- punyana = punyanya = belong to
- margga = marga = clan
- sukha = suka = happiness, like
- air = air = water
- niminumna = diminumnya = being drink
- savanakna = sebanyaknya, sebanyak-banyaknya = as many as possible
- vuatna = buatnya = for them
- huma = huma = dry rice field or orchard
- manghidupi = menghidupi = to bring life
- prakara = perkara = issue, problem
- varang = barang = item
- vuatana = buatannya = made
- curi = curi (pencuri) = steal (thieve)
- marvvangun = membangun = built
- hyang = hyang = spirit or gods
- tathapi = tetapi = but
- mancak = rancak (preserved in Minang) = beautiful, good
- rupa = rupa = look, form
- laki = laki-laki = man/men

== See also ==
- Kedukan Bukit Inscription
- Telaga Batu inscription
- Kota Kapur Inscription
