= Kedatuan =

Historical kingdoms in Southeast Asia

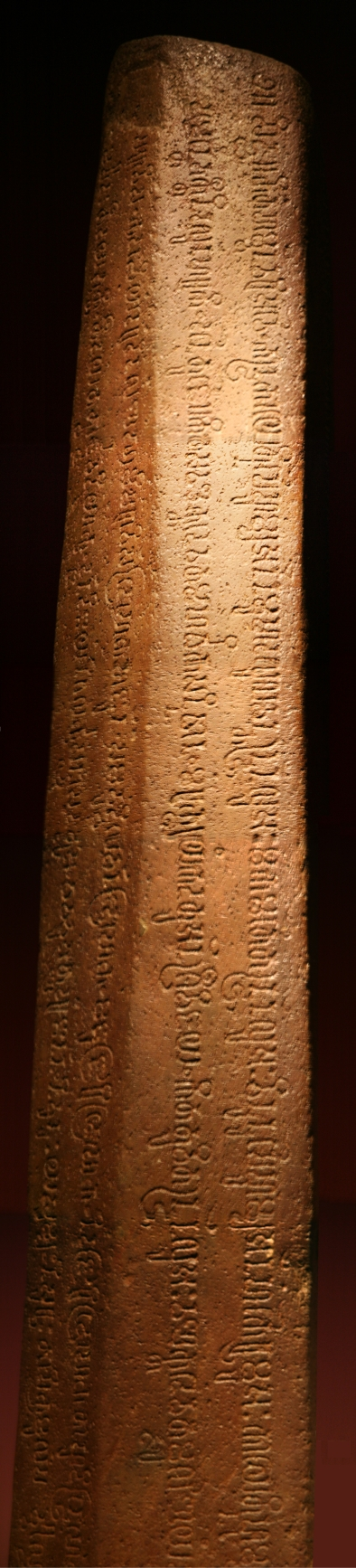
Kota Kapur inscription contains the word kadatuan çrivijaya.

Kedatuan (Old Malay, Philippine, and Sundanese spelling: kadatuan; Javanese romanization: kedaton) were historical semi-independent city-states or principalities throughout ancient Maritime Southeast Asia in the present-day Philippines, Indonesia, and Malaysia. In a modern Indonesian/Malay sense, they could be described as kingdoms or polities. The earliest written record mentioning the term kadatuan was the 7th-century Srivijayan Telaga Batu and Kota Kapur inscription from Sumatra, Indonesia.

== Etymology ==
Kedatuan and kadatuan are derived from the root word datu, which is derived from Proto-Malayo-Polynesian datu, with the possible reconstructed meaning of "lineage priest". Cognates in modern Austronesian languages include datu or dato in Philippine languages; datu in Acehnese, Minangkabau, Balinese, Makassarese, Mongondow, etc.; datuk in Malay; rato in Madurese; ratu in Javanese and Sundanese; ratu or latu in Maluku and the Lesser Sunda Islands; ratu in Fijian; rātū in Wayan (West Fijian); and lātū in Samoan. All of these have meanings related to leaders, heads of clans or ancestors, or men/women who are wealthy, respected, or skilled.

In the Philippines, kadatuan either means "the domain/jurisdiction of the datu" or was an abstract noun about the rank of the datu, formed by adding the circumfix ka- -an to datu. Datu (also spelled dato) referred to hereditary rulers of independent communities (called barangay, dulohan, pulok, banwa, etc. in various ethnic groups), as well as to paramount rulers who ruled over other datu with varying degrees of influence and prestige. They were present throughout the islands, from small villages to large loosely federated thalassocracies. Paramount datu, who ruled larger city-states connected to maritime trading routes, often took on other titles like lakan or loanwords like rajah or sultan, depending on ethnic group. They were first described by Spanish colonizers in the Boxer Codex (c.1590). During the Spanish colonial period in the Philippines, the datu became part of the native aristocracy, the principalia. They were part of the colonial government, often serving as gobernadorcillos and cabezas de barangay (elected town and village mayors). Among the Muslim Filipinos, the datu was part of a more centralized political system (sultanates) that paid obeisance to a royal family of the sultans.

The term kadatuan in Old Malay means "the realm of the datu" or "the residence of the datu". Constructed from the old Malay stem word datu with circumfix ke- -an to denote place. It is derived from datu or datuk, an ancient Austronesian title, and position for regional leader or elder that is used throughout Maritime Southeast Asia. It was mentioned in several inscriptions such as the 7th-century Srivijayan Old Malay Telaga Batu inscription and the 14th-century Old Sundanese Astana Gede inscription. In a wider sense, the term could refer to the whole principality, while in a smaller sense however, it could refer to the palace where the datu resides. The Kota Kapur inscription mentions "manraksa yan kadatuan çrivijaya" (to protect the Kadatuan of Srivijaya), thus Srivijaya is described as a kadatuan. From a Srivijayan perspective, the realm of the Kadatuan Srivijaya consisted of several wanua (settlements), each led by a datu (datuk), which means a community leader or elder. All of this realm was under the control of the central kadatuan, also led by a datu. The highest datu in Srivijaya was Dapunta Hyang.

Kedatuan is known and widely spread in the islands of Southeast Asia, including the east coast of Sumatra, the Minangkabau lands, the Malay Peninsula, the Borneo coast and the Philippine archipelago. In Javanese, the term ratu is used instead of datu, thus in Java karaton, keraton, or kraton is used instead of kedaton to describe the residence of the regional leader. The term is also known in Java as kedaton, the meaning however, has shifted to an architectural term to refer to the inner compound of the living quarter inside the keraton (palace) complex. For example, there is the kedaton complex within the central part of Keraton Surakarta Palace in Central Java.

== Political relations ==
Smaller kedatuan often became subordinated to more powerful neighboring kedatuan, which in turn were subordinate to a central king (maharaja). The more powerful kedatuan sometimes grew to become powerful kingdoms and occasionally tried to liberate themselves from their suzerain and sometimes enjoyed times of independence, and in turn, might have subjugated neighboring kedatuan. Kedatuan, large and small, often shifted allegiance or paid tribute to more than one powerful neighbor.

Some kedatuan, such as Srivijaya, rose to become empires. It is suggested that during its early formation, Srivijaya was a collection or some kind of federation consisting of several kadatuans (local principalities), all swearing allegiance to the central ruling kadatuan ruled by the Srivijayan maharaja.

== See also ==
- Barangay, a specific term for the same system of independent and semi-independent city-states used in the Philippines
- Mueang, a similar concept in mainland Southeast Asia, especially in Thailand and Laos
- Mandala, political model in ancient Southeast Asia
