= BUPS =

BUPS or Bups may refer to:

- Bilkent University Preparatory School, now Bilkent Laboratory and International School, in Turkey
- BUPS (Beacon Ultra Portable S-band), a type of World War II electronic warfare equipment
- "Bups", a song by Papa M from the 1999 album Live from a Shark Cage
- Bups Saggu is a British Bhangra DJ
