= Sagoo =

Sagoo is a surname. Notable people with the surname include:

- Bahadur Singh Sagoo (born 1973), Indian shot putter
- Bally Sagoo, British-Indian record producer
- Paul Sagoo (born 1974), British entrepreneur
- Bups Saggu, British Bhangra DJ producer
