= Bukit Seguntang =

Mountain in Indonesia

Coordinates: 2°59′50″S 104°43′32″E

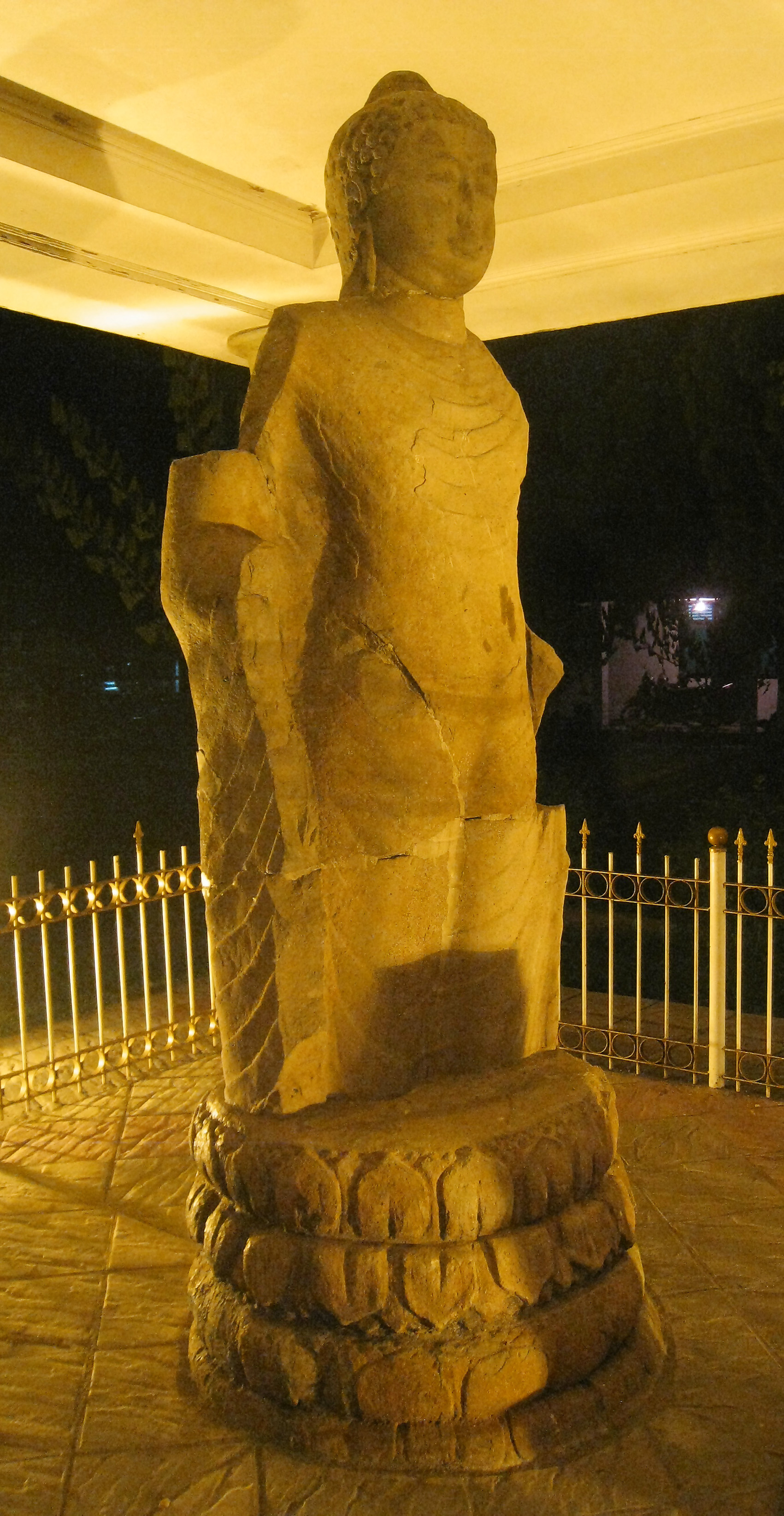
A statue of Buddha, discovered in Bukit Siguntang archaeological site, Palembang.

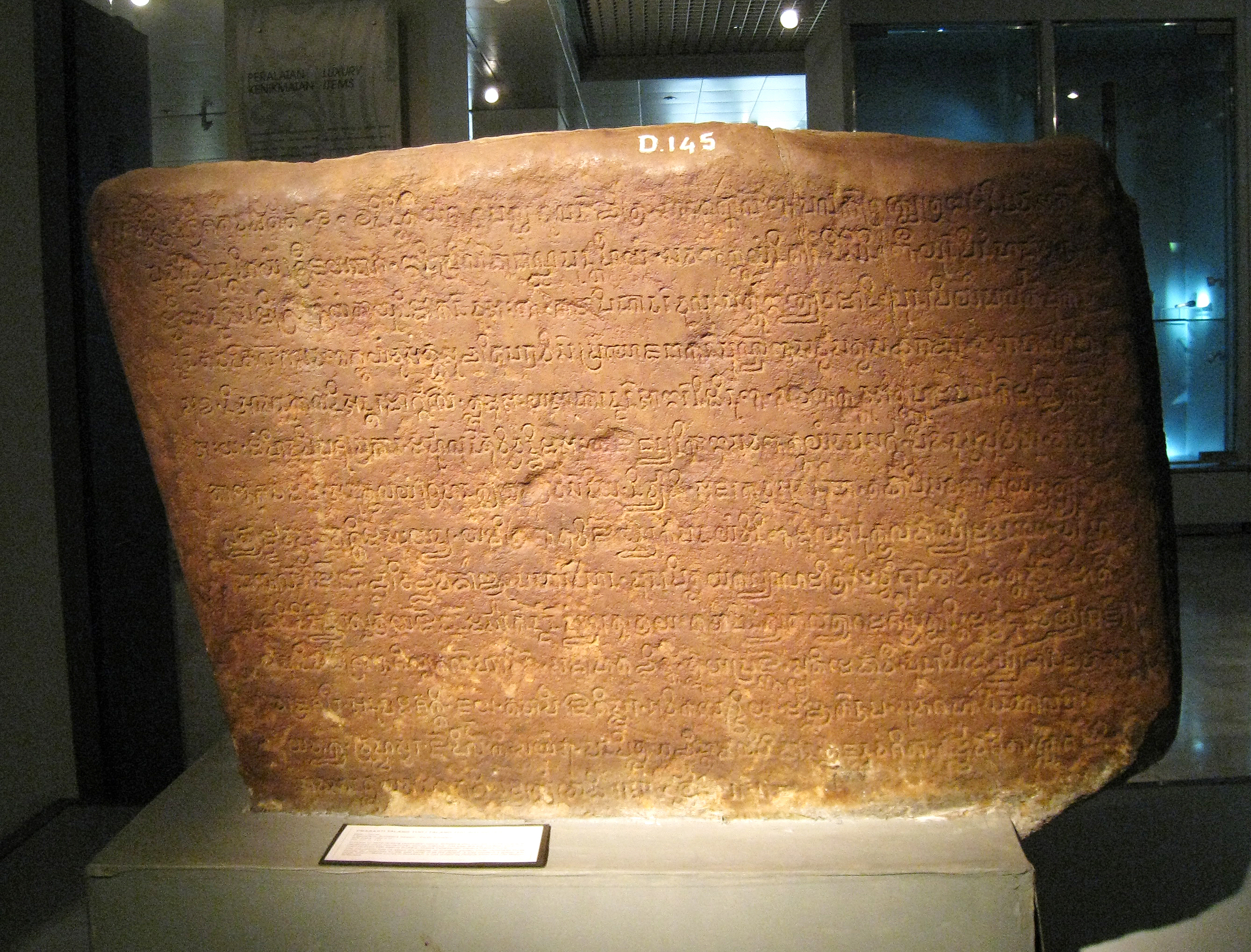
Talang Tuwo inscription. Discovered in Bukit Siguntang area.

Bukit Seguntang or Bukit Siguntang (English: Seguntang Hill or Siguntang Hill) is a 29–30 metres high small hill located at the northern bank of Musi River and within the vicinity of Palembang, capital city of South Sumatra, Indonesia. It is located around 3 kilometres north from Musi River northern bank and around 4 kilometres southwest from Palembang city center. The place is considered sacred by the locals and home to many archeological relics believed to be related to Srivijaya, once a dominating political power around the Malacca Strait (6th to 13th century AD). Today the hill holds the title of an archaeological park.

== Discovery ==
In the 1920s, a Buddha statue was discovered on this hill. It was discovered in pieces, the head was discovered first, several months later the body parts were discovered, however the leg part is still missing.

The 277cm-tall statue is made from granite stone, commonly thought to be from the neighboring island of Bangka. However, the existence of an unfinished statue in granite of a seated Buddha (currently in the Palembang Museum) proves that such statues could have been made locally. The statue likely belongs to the Pala period, dating from the late 7th to the early 8th centuries AD. The style was adopted during the Srivijaya era. Today, the statue is displayed in Sultan Mahmud Badaruddin II Museum, near the Kuto Besak fort.

In the Seguntang Hill area also found fragments of Boddhisattva statue, a ruin of stupa made of sandstone and brick, fragment of inscription, stone statue of Boddhisattva, statue of Kuwera, and a statue of Buddha Vairocana in seated position complete with prabha (halo aura) and chattra (umbrella). The fragment of inscription is called Bukit Siguntang Inscription, mentioned about a great battle that shed a lot of blood upon Bhumi Srivijaya which means the Srivijayan Land. The inscription also mentioned about a curse for those who had done evil deed.

In the southern side of the hill lay the Karanganyar site, where shards from the Tang and early Song dynasties were found. Two stone inscriptions dated back to the 7th century AD were found in the vicinity in the 1920s.

== Tomb complex ==
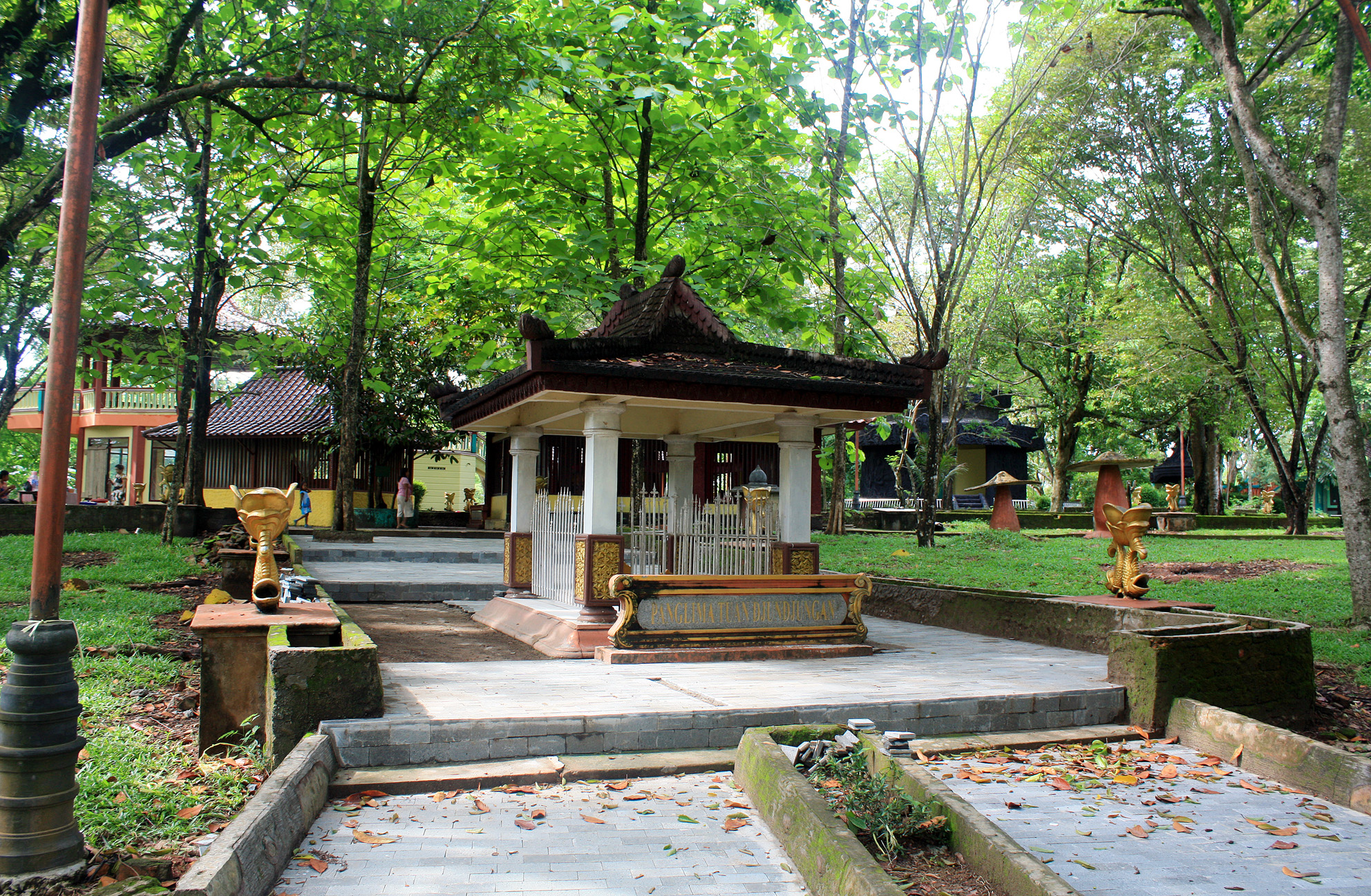
The tombs complex of local revered figures, on the center is the tomb of Panglima Tuan Junjungan.

Bukit Seguntang is the highest point in Palembang city. The complex is a hill with garden and large trees. On higher grounds within the complex there are some tombs linked by locals to the figures of Malay-Srivijayan royalties and heroes. There are seven Srivijayan figures entombed here:

- Raja Sigentar Alam
- Pangeran Raja Batu Api
- Putri Kembang Dadar
- Putri Rambut Selako
- Panglima Tuan Junjungan
- Panglima Bagus Kuning
- Panglima Bagus Karang

According to the Malay Annals manuscript, Bukit Seguntang is believed to be the place where a demi-god hero named Sang Sapurba descended to earth. He later become the ancestor of Malay kings that ruled kingdoms in Sumatra, Western Borneo, and the Malay Peninsula. Bukit Seguntang was revered as part of the Mahameru sacred mountain in Hindu-Buddhist mythology. It is considered sacred because it was believed as the homeland of Malay people. The kings that ruled Malacca Sultanate was said to be the descendants of Sang Sapurba.
