= Telaga Batu inscription =

7th-century Srivijayan inscription found in Sumatra, Indonesia

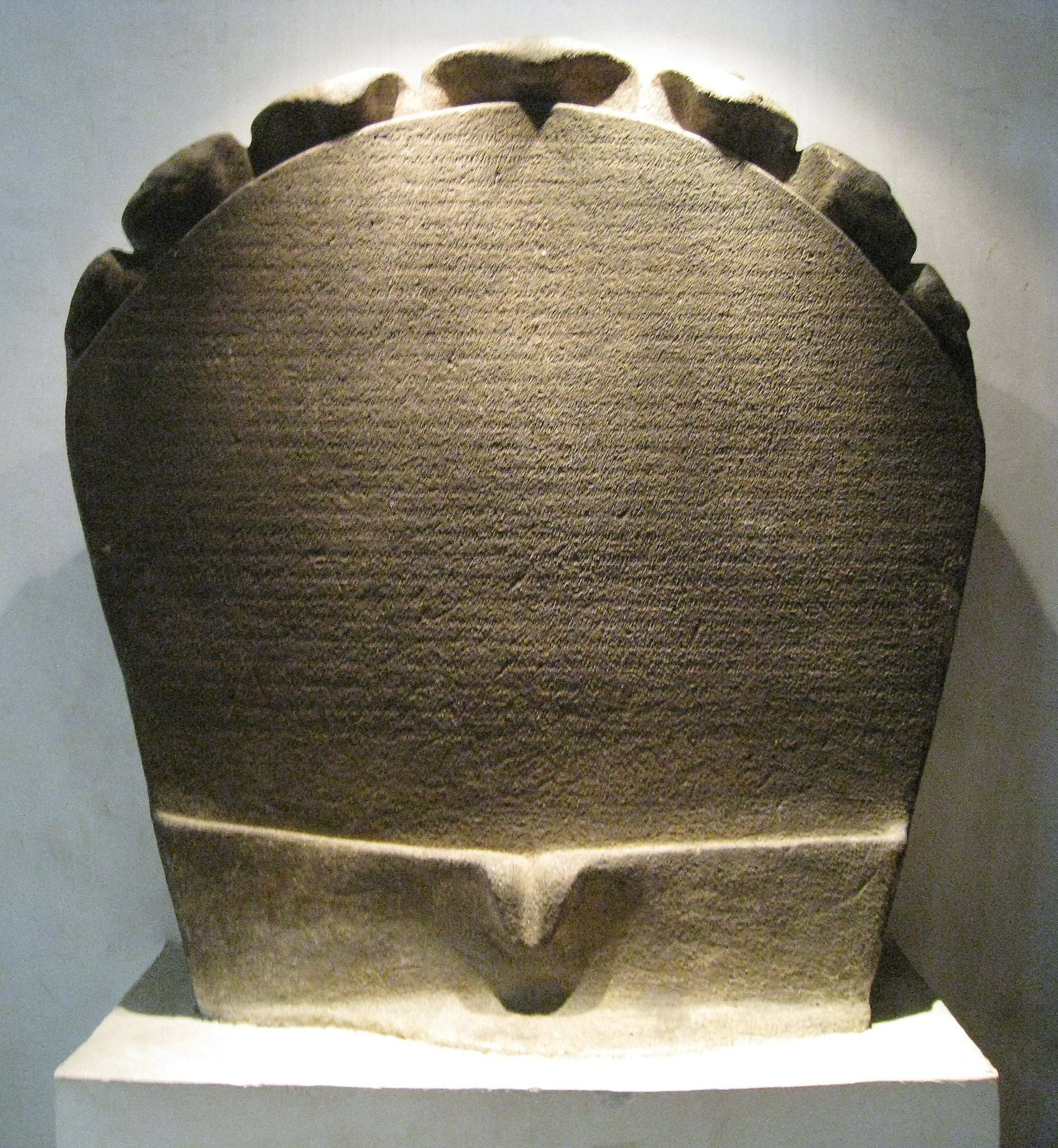
- Material: Andesite
- Size: 118 cm height, 148 cm width
- Writing: Pallawa script in Old Malay
- Created: 605 Saka (683 CE)
- Discovered: Palembang, South Sumatra, Indonesia
- Present location: National Museum of Indonesia, Jakarta
- Registration: D.155

Telaga Batu inscription is a 7th-century Srivijayan inscription discovered in Sabokingking, 3 Ilir, Ilir Timur II, Palembang, South Sumatra, Indonesia, around the 1950s. The inscription is now displayed in the National Museum of Indonesia, Jakarta, with inventory number D.155. In previous years, around thirty Siddhayatra inscriptions were discovered around Southern Sumatra, all concerning the Siddhayatra journey of Dapunta Hyang Sri Jayanasa, which, according to Kedukan Bukit Inscription took place around the year 605 Saka (683 AD). Today all of these Siddhayatra inscriptions are stored in the National Museum of Indonesia.

The inscription was carved on an andesite stone measuring 118 cm tall and 148 cm wide. The top of the stone is adorned with seven nāga heads, and on the lower portion, there is some kind of water spout to channel the water that was likely poured over the stone during a ceremonial allegiance ritual. The inscription was written with Pallava letters in the Old Malay language.

== Contents ==
The text content of the inscription is quite long and is arranged in several lines. However, many of the letters have been eroded and are difficult to read, probably due to the use of the stone as a part of the allegiance ritual described in the inscription. The ritual was likely performed by pouring water over the text of the stone, which would collect at the bottom of the stone, and be poured via the waterspout to be consumed by people who swore their allegiance to the king. Some lines of the inscription can still be read. The content of the Telaga Batu inscription from the third to the fifth row is as follows:

=== Original script ===
“kamu vanyakmamu, rājaputra, prostara, bhūpati, senāpati, nāyaka, pratyaya, hāji pratyaya, dandanayaka, ....murddhaka, tuhā an vatak, vuruh, addhyāksi nījavarna, vāsīkarana, kumaramatya, cātabhata, adhikarana, karmma...., kāyastha, sthāpaka, puhāvam, vaniyāga, pratisara, kamu marsī hāji, hulun hāji, wanyakmamu urang, niwunuh sumpah dari mangmang kamu kadaci tida bhakti di aku”.

=== Translations ===
"You all: the son of kings, ministers, regents, commanders, lords, nobles, viceroys, judges, .... murddhaka, chairman of the workers, supervisors, commoners, weapons experts, ministers, soldiers, construction workers, karmma ..., clerk, architect, skippers, merchants, captains, ye king's servants, king's slaves, all people, will be killed by the spells of your oath if you are not loyal to me. "

== Interpretation ==
The text written upon the inscription is quite long, however, the content mainly concerns the curses cast upon everyone who may commit or who has committed treason against kadatuan of Srivijaya or disobeyed the orders of dātu (datuk). According to Casparis, the people, occupations, or titles mentioned in this inscription were categorized as potentially dangerous people or groups of people who might revolt against Srivijayan hegemony. To prevent possible uprisings, the ruler of Srivijaya thought it was important for them to be sworn to pledge their loyalty under the threat of a curse.

These titles are mentioned: rājaputra (princes, lit: sons of king), prostara (ministers), bhūpati (regional rulers), senāpati (generals), nāyaka (local community leaders), pratyaya (nobles), hāji pratyaya (lesser kings), dandanayaka (judges), tuhā an vatak (workers inspectors), vuruh (workers), addhyāksi nījavarna (lower supervisors), vāsīkarana (blacksmiths/weapon makers), kumārāmātya (junior minister), cātabhata (soldiers), adhikarana (officials), kāyastha (municipal officials), sthāpaka (artisans), puhāvam (ship captains), vaniyāga (traders), marsī hāji (king's servants), hulun hāji (king's slaves).

This curse inscription contains one of the most complete surviving lists of state officials. Because of the complex and stratified titles of state officials, some historian have suggested that these titles only existed in the capital of the kingdom, thus insisting that the court of Srivijaya should be located in Palembang. However, Soekmono has suggested that this curse inscription should not be placed in the center of the court, because this inscription contains an intimidation curse for anybody who drohaka or committed treasons against kadatuan, and he suggested that the capital of Srivijaya should be located in Minanga as mentioned in Kedukan Bukit Inscription assumed around Candi Muara Takus.

== See also ==
- Kedukan Bukit Inscription
- Kota Kapur Inscription
- Talang Tuwo inscription
