= Sri Jayanasa of Srivijaya =

Sri Jayanasa
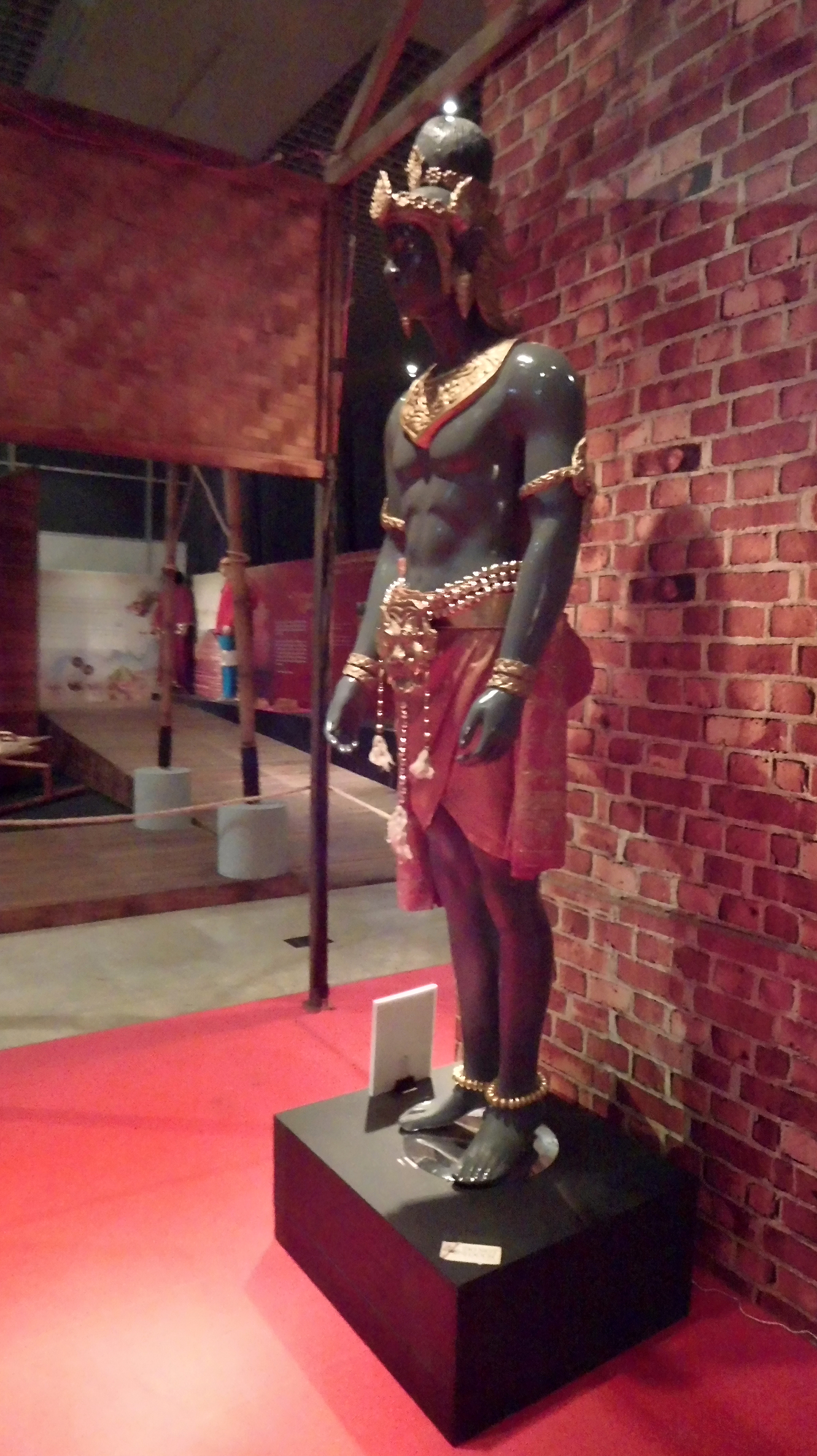
- The depiction of Dapunta Hyang Sri Jayanasa, the first emperor of Srivijaya, displayed in "Kedatuan Sriwijaya" exhibition in November 2017. National Museum of Indonesia, Jakarta, Indonesia.

Maharaja of Srivijaya
- Reign: 671–702
- Predecessor: Position established
- Successor: Sri Indravarman
Names
- Ḍapunta Hiyaṃ Śrī Jayanāśa

Dapunta Hyang Sri Jayanasa (IAST: Ḍapunta Hiyaṃ Śrī Jayanāśa) was the first Maharaja (Great King) of Srivijaya and thought to be the dynastic founder of Kadatuan Srivijaya. His name was mentioned in the series of Srivijayan inscriptions dated from the late 7th century CE dubbed the "Siddhayatra inscriptions", describing his sacred journey to acquire blessings and also to conquer neighboring areas. He reigned around the turn of the late 7th century to early 8th century, more precisely in the period between 671 and 702 CE.

== Biography ==
Yijing, a Chinese Buddhist monk who visited Srivijaya and stayed for 6 months in 671, was impressed by the generosity, kindness, and hospitality demonstrated by the king of Srivijaya. The king mentioned in Yijing's report was later linked to the king mentioned in the oldest Srivijayan inscription (dated 682 CE), the Kedukan Bukit inscription discovered in Palembang. However, later historians discount the interpretation of the inscriptions as being connected to the account by Yijing.

The Kedukan Bukit inscription dated 605 saka (683 CE), mentioned a king titled Dapunta Hyang who performed a Siddhayatra (sacred journey) by the boat. He departed from Minanga Tamwan accompanied by 20,000 soldiers heading to Matajap and conquering several areas. Other inscriptions tell of the Siddhayatra journey and Srivijayan conquests of surrounding areas, such as Kota Kapur discovered in Bangka island (686 CE), Karang Brahi discovered in Jambi Hulu (686 CE) and Palas Pasemah discovered in southern Lampung, all mention the same event. From all of these inscriptions, it was concluded that Dapunta Hyang established the Srivijayan empire after defeating his enemies in Jambi, Palembang, Southern Lampung, and Bangka island, and he even went further to launch a military campaign against Bhumi Java that probably contributed to the decline of the Tarumanagara kingdom in West Java.
