= Kedukan Bukit inscription =

Oldest surviving of Malay inscription

Kedukan Bukit Inscription
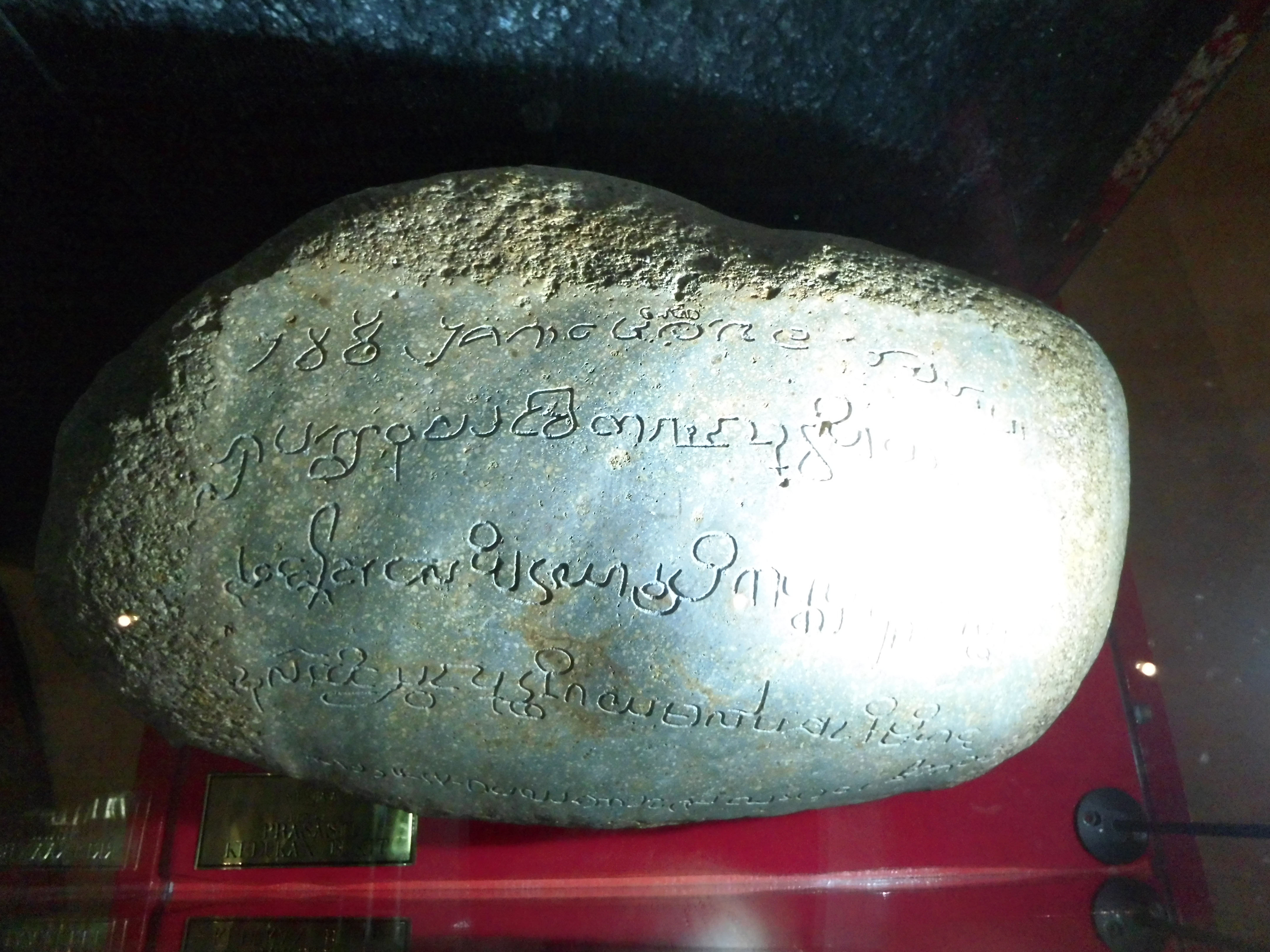
- The inscription displayed in the National Museum of Indonesia.
- Material: Stone
- Size: 45 cm × 80 cm (18 in × 31 in)
- Writing: Pallava script
- Created: 1 May 683 (1343 years ago)
- Discovered: 29 November 1920 (105 years ago); Kedukan Bukit, South Sumatra, Dutch East Indies
- Discovered by: M. Batenburg
- Present location: National Museum of Indonesia, Jakarta
- Registration: D. 161
- Language: Old Malay

The Kedukan Bukit inscription (Indonesian: Prasasti Kedukan Bukit) is an inscription discovered by the Dutchman C.J. Batenburg on 29 November 1920 at Kedukan Bukit, South Sumatra, Dutch East Indies (now Indonesia), on the banks of Tatang River, a tributary of Musi River. It is the oldest surviving specimen of the Malay language, in a form known as Old Malay. It is a small stone of 45 cm × 80 cm (18 in × 31 in). This inscription is dated 1 May 683 CE. This inscription was written in Pallava script.

== Content ==
=== Transliteration ===
Line	Transliteration
1	svasti śrī śaka varṣātīta 605 ekādaśī śukla-
2	pakṣa vulan vaiśākha ḍapunta hiyaṃ nāyik di
3	sāmvau maṅalap siddhayātra di saptamī śuklapakṣa
4	vulan jyeṣṭha ḍapunta hiyaṃ marlapas dari mināṅa
5	tāmvan mamāva yaṃ vala dua lakṣa daṅan kośa
6	dua ratus cāra di sāmvau daṅan jālan sarivu
7	tlu ratus sapulu dua vañakña dātaṃ di mukha upaṃ
8	sukhacitta di pañcamī śuklapakṣa vulan āsāḍha
9	laghu mudita dātaṃ marvuat vanua ...
10	śrīvijaya jaya siddhayātra subhikṣa nityakāla

=== Modern Common Malay translation ===
Svasti! Pada 11 hari bulan separuh Vaiśākha tahun 605 Śaka, Dapunta Hiyang menaiki sampan untuk mendapatkan siddhayātra. Pada hari ke tujuh iaitu 15 hari bulan separuh Jyeṣṭha, Dapunta Hiyang berlepas dari Mināṅa membawa 20000 orang bala tentera dengan bekal-bekalan sebanyak 200 peti di sampan diiringi 1312 orang yang berjalan kaki banyaknya datang ke hulu Upang dengan sukacitanya. Pada 15 hari bulan separuh āsāḍha dengan mudah dan gembiranya datang membuat benua ... Śrīvijaya jaya siddhayātra subhikṣa nityakāla!

=== Indonesian translation ===
Selamat! Tahun Śaka memasuki 605, pada hari kesebelas, Dapunta Hiyang menaiki sampan untuk mengambil siddhayātra. Pada hari ketujuh, yaitu 15 hari pertama bulan Jyeṣṭha, Dapunta Hiyang meninggalkan Mināṅa untuk membawa 20.000 orang pasukan tentara dengan perbekalan sebanyak 200 peti di sampan diiringi sebanyak 1312 orang yang berjalan kaki datang ke hulu Upang dengan sukacita. Pada 15 hari pertama bulan āsāḍha dengan mudah dan gembiranya datang membuat benua ... Sriwijaya jaya siddhayātra subhikṣa nityakāla!

=== English translation ===
Om swasti astu! All hail and prosperity. In the year 605 of the Saka calendar, on the eleventh day at half-month of Waisaka, Sri Baginda took dugouts in order to obtain siddhayatra. On Day 7, on the 15th day at half-month of Jyestha, Sri Baginda extricated himself from minānga tāmvan. He took 20,000 troops with him ... as many as 200 in dugouts, with 1,312 foot soldiers. They arrived at ... Truly merry on the fifteenth day of the half-month..., agile, happy, and they made a trip to the country ... Great Sriwijaya! Prosperity and riches ...

== See also ==
- History of Indonesia
- Kota Kapur Inscription
- Laguna Copperplate Inscription
- Talang Tuwo inscription
- Telaga Batu inscription
- Timeline of Indonesian history
