= Bups Saggu =

British-born musician

- Origin: Wolverhampton, United Kingdom
- Genres: Bhangra
- Occupations: DJ, music producer, singer
- Years active: 2008–present
- Labels: Moviebox, VIP Records, Vvanjhali Records, Zee Music, T-Series
- Website: www.bupssaggu.com

Bups Saggu is a British Bhangra DJ, music producer and singer based in Wolverhampton, England.

== Early life and education ==
Saggu was born in Wolverhampton, England. He learned to play the tabla at the local gurdwara. He has a degree in accounting, and he also studied music and production at London's IMW campus.

== Career ==
Saggu started his musical career as a Bhangra dancer, with the Punjab Bhangra Group from Wolverhampton, with whom he toured the UK and the world. He then turned to playing dhol because he "took a liking to the larger and louder sound". He played for the Midland Boyz, before deciding to become a DJ himself, playing at clubs across the Midlands. The next step in his career was to join the Safri Boys, touring the world with other bands, while studying in the university, and later studying music and production at London's IMW campus. After graduating, he joined the Rhythm Shakers Collective but left shortly after. He then started his own show Groove Asia, while building his own recording studio, Loft Recordings, and working on his first solo album Redefined, released in 2011 on Moviebox. The album included the tracks "Photo Rakh Ke", featuring Miss Pooja and "Matha Tekhiya" featuring Lehmber Hussainpuri, both of which charted in BBC charts.

2013 saw the next album Global on VIP Records. Global won Best Album of 2013 by Eastern Eye. Saggu himself won Best Music Producer, and the track "Drama Queen", featuring Daljit Mattu, won Best Single. He was also nominated for three categories in the PTC Punjabi Music Awards for 2014. The album also included the song "Punjabi Hurrr" which charted number 1 on the Asian Music Chart Top 40.

Since Global, Saggu focused on his DJ career with the Bups Saggu Roadshow and collaborating with other artists. He released several notable singles including "Lalkara" featuring Sazia Judge on VIP Records in 2014, "Miss Kaur" featuring Master Saleem in 2015 and "Bodyguard" featuring Sandy Sandhu and Jotti Dhillon on Vvanjhali Records later in 2015. He started 2017 with "Black Magic" featuring Stylish Singh on Zee Music which was his first single as a vocalist, and was followed up with "Faaltu" featuring Zora Randhawa later that year. In 2018 he released "Hor ni Peeni" featuring Sahib on VIP Records, which charted on the Asian Music Chart Top 40, followed by "Laung Gawacha" with Brown Gal and Millind Gaba, on T-Series.

== Discography ==
=== Albums ===
Year	Name	Record label
2011	Redefined	Moviebox
2013	Global	VIP Records

=== Singles ===
Year	Song	Singer	Label	Ref
2014	"Jump to the Bhangra"	Manjeet Pappu	VIP Records	
2015	"Bodyguard"	Jotti Dhillion & Sandy Sandhu	Vvanjhali Records	
2015	"Miss Kaur"	Master Saleem	VIP Records	
2017	"Garaari"	Saini Surinder & Preet Kaur	Moviebox	
2017	"Faaltu"	Zora Randhawa	Moviebox	
2017	"Black Magic"	Bups Saggu & Stylish Singh	Zee Music	
2018	"Hor Ni Peeni"	Sahib	VIP Records	
2018	"Laung Gwacha"	Bups Saggu, Brown Gal, Millind Gaba	T-Series	
2019	"Favourite Rang"	R S Chauhan	VIP Records	
2019	"Sugar"	Stylish Singh	VIP Records	
2019	"Mere Naal De"	Prabh Ubhi	VIP Records	
2019	"Turn"	Stylish Singh	VIP Records	
2021	"Teri Meri"	Manwal	Disruptive records	
