= Kota Kapur inscription =

Srijivayan inscription found in Bangka Island, Indonesia

Kota Kapur Inscription
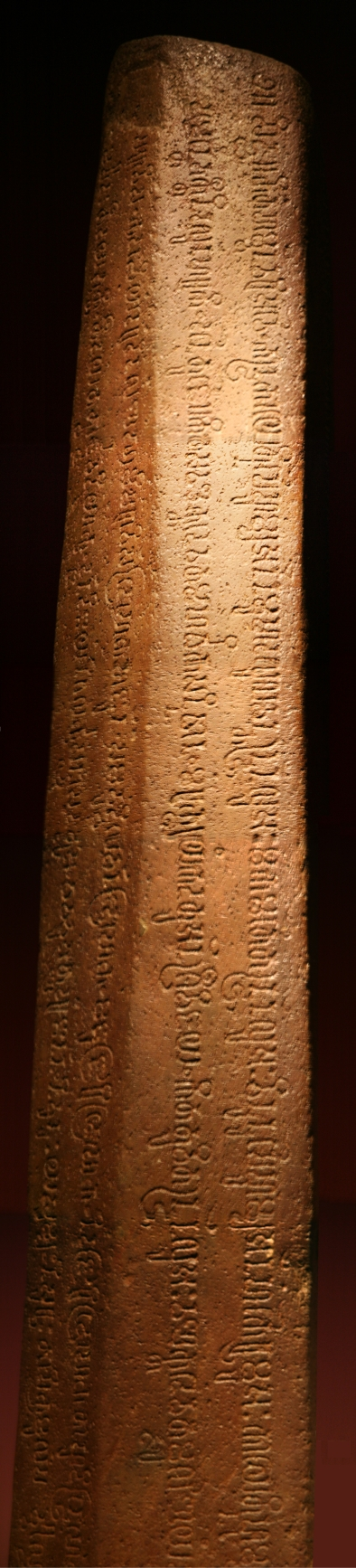
- Kota Kapur inscription pinnacle
- Material: Stone
- Writing: Pallava script
- Created: 28 February 686 CE
- Discovered: December 1892; Bangka Island, Bangka Belitung Islands, Indonesia
- Discovered by: J.K. van der Meulen
- Present location: National Museum of Indonesia, Jakarta
- Registration: D. 80
- Language: Old Malay

Kota Kapur Inscription is an inscription discovered on the western coast of Bangka Island, off coast South Sumatra, Indonesia, by J.K. van der Meulen in December 1892. It was named after the village of the same name which is the location where these archaeological findings were discovered.

This inscription uses Old Malay language written in Pallava script. It was one of the oldest surviving written evidence of the ancient Malay language. The inscription dated the first day of half moon Vaiśākha in the year 608 Śaka (28 February 686 CE), mentioned the curse of whoever committed treason against Srivijaya and the beginning of Srivijayan invasion against Java.

The inscription was first examined and dated by H. Kern, a Dutch epigrapher who worked for Bataviaasch Genootschap in Batavia. At first, he thought that Srivijaya was the name of a king.

George Cœdès noted the name on the inscriptions was that of Srivijaya, a Buddhist kingdom in 638–86, "that had just conquered the hinterland of Jambi and the island of Bangka and was preparing to launch a military expedition against Java." The name corresponds to Yijing's.

== Content ==
Kota Kapur inscriptions is one of the five inscriptions edited by Sri Jayanasa, the ruler of Srivijaya. Most of these inscriptions contain curses for crime, trespassing, and treason against Srivijaya. The contents were translated by Cœdès:

=== Transliteration ===
Line	Transliteration
1	siddha titaṃ hamvan vari avai kandra kāyet nipaihumpaan namuha ulu lavan tandrun luaḥ makamatai tandrun luaḥ vinunu paihumpaan hakairu muaḥ kāyet nihumpa unai tuṅai
2	umenteṃ bhaktī ni ulun haraki unai tuṅai kita savañakta devata maharddhika sannidhāna maṃrakṣa yaṃ kadatuan śrīvijaya kita tuvi tandrun luaḥ vañakta devata mūlāña yaṃ parsumpahan
3	parāvis kadāci yaṃ uraṃ di dalaṃña bhūmi ājñāña kadatuan inī parāvis drohaka haṅun samavuddhi lavan drohaka maṅujāri drohaka niujāri drohaka tāhu diṃ drohaka tīdaya
4	marppādaḥ tīda ya bhakti tīda ya tatvārjjava diy āku dṅan di iyaṃ nigalarku sanyāsa datūa dhava vuatña uraṃ inan nivunuḥ ya sumpaḥ nisuruḥ tāpik ya mulaṃ parvvāṇḍan dātu śrīvi-
5	jaya tālu muaḥ ya dṅan gotrasantānāña tathāpi savañakña yaṃ vuatña jāhat makalaṅit uraṃ makasākit makagīla mantrā gada viṣaprayoga upuḥ tūva tāmval
6	sarāmvat kasīhan vaśīkaraṇa ityevamādi jāṅan muaḥ ya siddha pulaṃ ka iya muaḥ yaṃ doṣāña vuatña jāhat inan tathāpi nivunuḥ ya sumpaḥ tuvi mulaṃ yaṃ mañu-
7	ruḥ marjjahāti yaṃ marjjahāti yaṃ vātu nipratiṣṭha ini tuvi nivunuḥ ya sumpaḥ tālu muaḥ ya mulaṃ sāraṃbhāña uraṃ drohaka tida bhakti tida tatrārjjava diy āku dhava vua-
8	tña nivunuḥ ya sumpaḥ ini graṅ kadāci iya bhakti tatrārjjava diy āku dṅan di yaṃ nigalarku sanyāsa datūa śanti muaḥ kavualāña dṅan gotrasantānāña
9	samṛddha svastha niroga nirupadrava subhikṣa muaḥ yaṃ vanuāña parāvis śaka varṣātīta 608 diṃ pratipada śuklapakṣa vulan vaiśākha tatkālāña
10	yaṃ maṃmaṃ sumpaḥ ini nipāhat di velāña yaṃ vala śrīvijaya kalivat manāpik yaṃ bhūmi jāva tida bhakti ka śrīvijaya

=== Translation ===
1. Success ! (followed probably by cursing mantra formula that cannot be understood or translated)
2. All oh thou gods almighty, all that gathered to protect Kadatuan (palace/kingdom) Srivijaya; all of thou gods that starts the beginning of the swear of all swear (curse)!!
3. If in this lands, the realm under Kadatuan rule, there is a rebel, conspired with rebel, talk to rebel, and listen to rebel;
4. know the rebel, dishonor, ungrateful, unfaithful to me or those whom I've appointed as datu; may all people that commit those deeds will die caused by curse or fell under expedition (war campaign) against them wage by a datu or led by several datus od Srivijaya, and let them;
5. punished altogether with their clan and family. Moreover, let the evil deeds; such as disturbing other's soul, make other sick, cause people to suffer madness, using mantra (magic spell), poison, using upas (poison), tuba (poison), and ganja (marijuana),
6. saramwat (?), pekasih (love charm), force themself upon others, and many other things, may all that deed will not succeed and strike back to those whom guilty for that evil deeds; may all die because of curse. Also those whom spread evil rumors to sway people.
7. May those whom destroy the stone placed in this place also die because of the curse and directly punished. May all murderer, rebel, all of those ungrateful and unfaithful to me, all the performer of those deeds
8. die because of curse. But for those whom obey and faithful to me and those whom I have appointed as datu, may all their efforts are blessed, also their clan and family
9. with success, welfare, good health, freed from disaster, abundance everything for all their lands! In the year 608 Saka, first day of half moon Vaisakha (28 February 686), in that time
10. this curse is said; the carving took place during the Srivijaya army just departed to attack Java, which is not submit to Srivijaya.

The inscriptions was carved on a pinnacle stone with several sides, with 177 cm height, 32 cm width on base and 19 cm width on top.

== Significance ==
Kota Kapur inscription was the first Srivijayan inscription discovered, long before the discovery of the Kedukan Bukit Inscription on 29 November 1920, and before the Talang Tuwo inscription that was discovered several days earlier on 17 November 1920.

The Kota Kapur inscription, together with other archaeological findings in the region, was the testament of Srivijaya era. It has opened a new horizon and revealed the history of Hindu-Buddhist era in that area. This inscription also uncovered the ancient society inhabiting the region during 6th and 7th century that clearly shows Hindu-Buddhist influence.

== See also ==
- Kedukan Bukit Inscription
- Telaga Batu inscription
- Talang Tuwo inscription
