= Anjuk Ladang inscription =

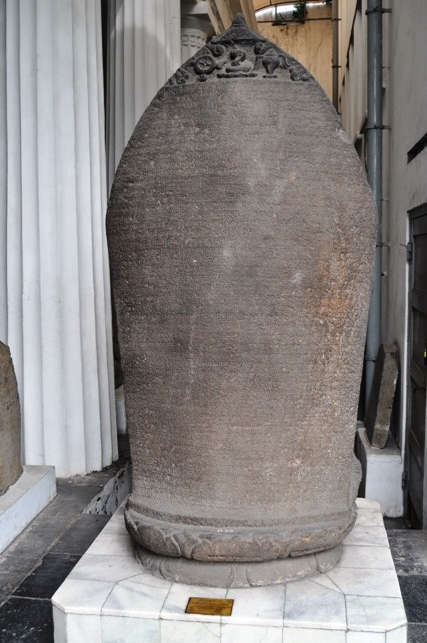
- Anjuk Ladang inscription, displayed at National Museum of Indonesia, Jakarta
- Material: Andesite stone
- Writing: Pallawa script in Old Javanese
- Created: 935/937 CE
- Discovered: Candirejo village, Loceret, Nganjuk Regency, East Java, Indonesia
- Present location: National Museum of Indonesia, Jakarta
- Registration: D.59

Anjuk Ladang inscription is a stone stele inscription dated to the year 859 Saka (L.-C. Damais' version, 937 CE) or 857 Saka (Brandes' version, 935 CE) issued by King Sri Isyana (Pu Sindok) of Kingdom of Mataram after moving his capital to the eastern part of Java. The inscription mentioned and honored the commendable deed of the people of Anjuk Ladang village on assisting Pu Sindok on repelling the invading Malay king in the year 937 CE. Thus King Pu Sindok has erected a monument of victory (jayastambha) to commemorate this heroic event.

This inscription is also called Candi Lor inscription because it was found near the ruins of Candi Lor temple, in Candirejo village, Loceret, Nganjuk Regency, a few kilometers southeast of modern Nganjuk city, East Java. The name "Anjuk Ladang" refer to the place mentioned in this inscription, and then associated with the origin of Nganjuk Regency, since this inscription contains the first mention of its current toponym.

== Content ==
Some parts of this inscription — especially at the top of the inscription, has eroded and could not be read entirely. Several readable lines states that King Pu Sindok has ordered the rice paddies of kakatikan (?) in Anjukladang to be made as Sima land, and offered to Bathara in hyang prasada kabhaktyan in Sri Jayamerta, as a dharma (dedication) of the Samgat of Anjukladang. Sima land is rice-cultivated land recognized through royal edict, with its yield available for taxation or other purposes, in this case its yield was free from taxation and used to fund a temple instead.

According to J.G. de Casparis, the villagers of Anjuk Ladang was awarded for their service and merit on assisting the king's army — under the leadership of Pu Sindok, to repel the invading Malayu (Sumatran, highly possible referring Srivijaya) army that tried to approach the capital and has reached the area near Nganjuk. For this extraordinary service, Pu Sindok later would ascend to the throne of Mataram kingdom. In addition, the inscription also contains the information on the existence of a sacred building. According to de Casparis in his paper Some Notes on Transfer of Capitals in Ancient Sri Lanka and Southeast Asia, the inscription mentioned that King Pu Sindok has erected a monument of victory (jayastambha) after successfully repelled the invading Malay king, and in the year 937 CE, the monument was replaced by a temple. Most likely, the sacred building mentioned in this inscription was referring to the Lor temple, a temple ruins made of red bricks located in the Candirejo village.

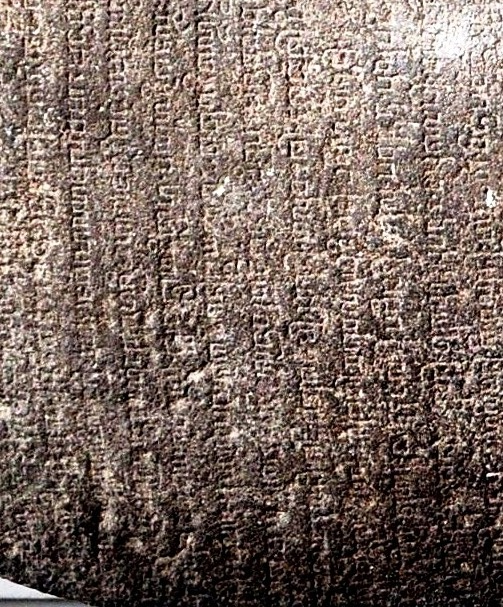
Part of the inscription on the Anjuk Ladang stele.

Quotation of Anjuk Ladang inscription: A. 14-15:

... parnnaha nikanaŋ lmah uŋwana saŋ hyaŋ prasada atêhêra jaya[sta]mbha wiwit matêwêkniraŋlahakan satru[nira] [haj]ja[n] ri [ma]layu.

in this place [who have chosen] to be the establishment of a sacred building, in lieu of a victory monument, [it was there] marks the first time he [the king] defeated the enemy king from Malayu.

The inscription also mentioning the kingdom's name:

Kita prasiddha mangraksa kadatwan rahyangta i Mdaŋ i Bhûmi Matarâm.

This phrase reveals the name of the palace of the Mataram Kingdom. This shows that the name Mdaŋ (read: Mdang or Medang) is a Kadatwan (read: Kadatwan or Kedaton) meaning palace. The phrase "Kadatwan Mdaŋ i Bhûmi Matarâm" literally means "Medang Palace in the Land of Mataram", which means that Medang is the name of the palace of the Mataram Kingdom.

This inscription is now in the collection of the National Museum in Jakarta with inventory number D.59.

== See also ==
- Minto Stone (928)
- Calcutta Stone (1041)
- Mataram–Srivijayan wars
