= History of Srivijaya =

History of the early empire based on Sumatra (c. 671–1025)

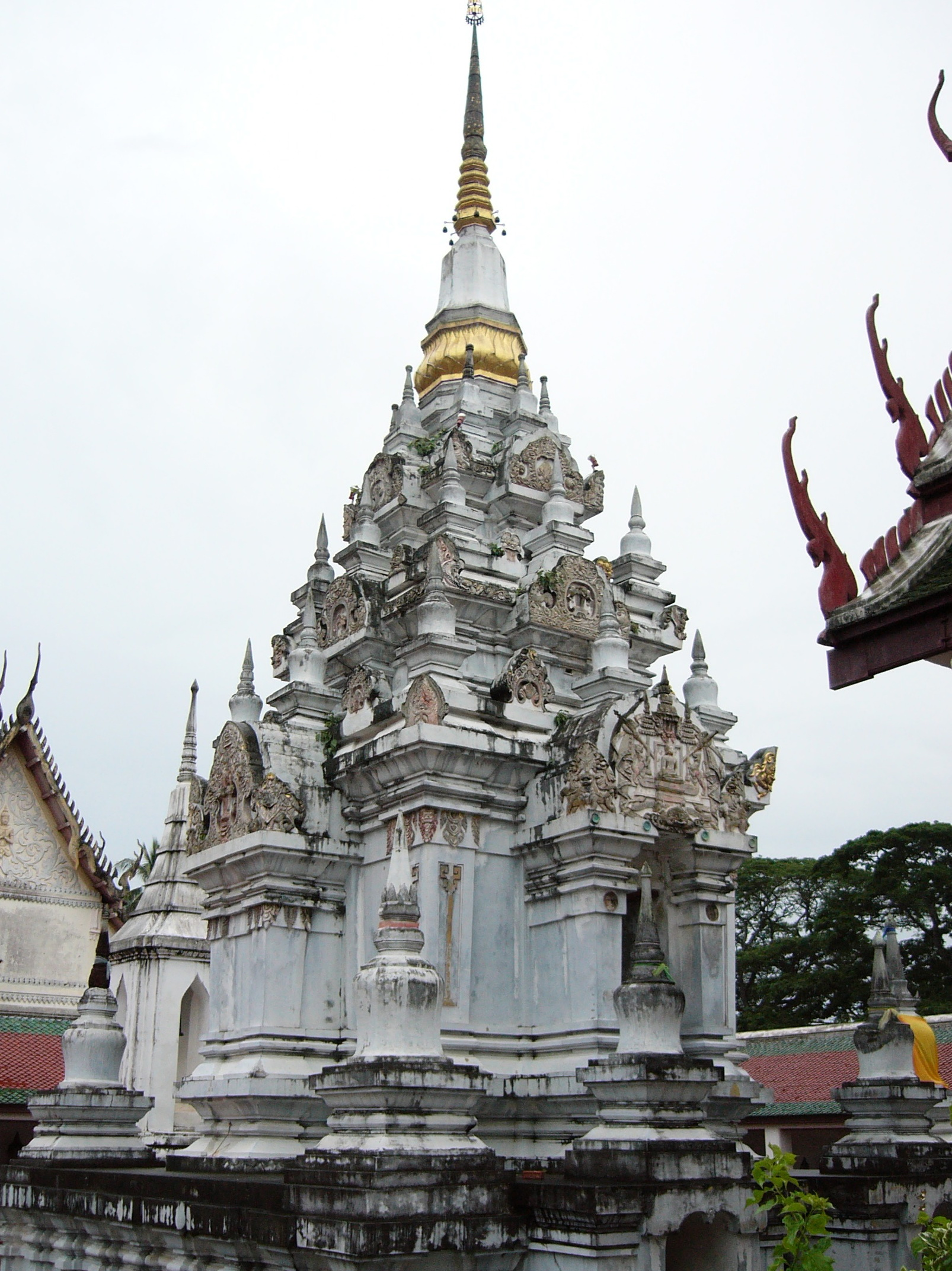
The pagoda of Wat Phra Borommathat Chaiya in Thailand is an elaborate surviving example of Srivijayan architecture.

Srivijaya was a thalassocratic empire located on the island of Sumatra (nowadays part of Indonesia), which influenced much of Southeast Asia. Records of the Srivijaya Kingdom, including archaeological traces, come mostly from Chinese chronicles, which refer to the kingdom as "Shih-li-fo-shih" or "Sanfoqi". Yijing's accounts are important for describing Srivijaya, which he visited in 671 for about seven months. Srivijaya later became known as a forgotten kingdom because its historic existence was long obscured. When French historian George Cœdès published his article on the "Kingdom of Srivijaya" in 1918, he managed to bring the forgotten kingdom to global attention.

Srivijaya was one of the most important centers of Buddhist expansion throughout Southeast Asia from the 7th to the 11th century. Srivijaya was the first polity to dominate much of the western maritimes in Southeast Asia. Due to its strategic location, Srivijaya developed complex technologies for the necessary utilization of maritime resources.

The Srivijaya Kingdom was established by Maharaja Dapunta Hyang Sri Jayanasa, its founder and first king. He would then eventually start the Srivijaya and the commence, which began around in the 7th century. When the Cholas broke off cordial relations with Srivijaya, an intervening war and a series of raids brought about the collapse of the polity. At times, Srivijaya was drawn into conflicts with major rivals like the Cholas as well as minor neighboring polities. Srivijaya would remain a forgotten kingdom following its disappearance.

== History ==
=== Beginning ===
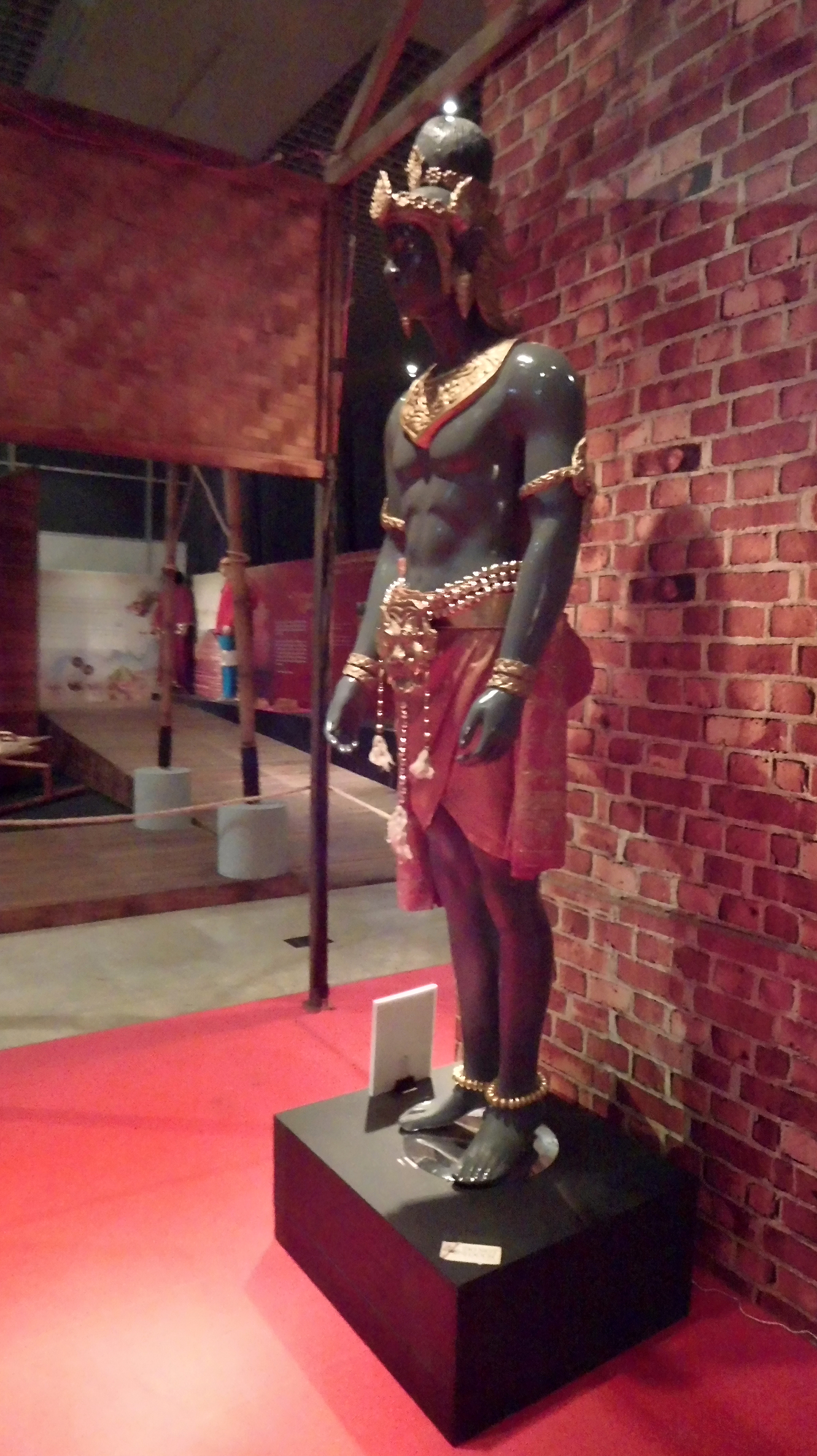
Statue of Dapunta Hyang Sri Jayanasa, founder and first king of Srivijaya

Historical sources place the Srivijaya era from the 7th century until its decline in the 12th and 13th centuries. The oldest known surviving inscription is the Kedukan Bukit inscription, which dates to 683 CE and was discovered by C.J. Batenburg during the Dutch colonial rule of Indonesia. Batenburg discovered the stone inscription near Palembang, Sumatra. The Kedukan Bukit inscription contains most of the existing evidence about Srivijaya's interpretations.

The Kingdom of Srivijaya was established by Maharaja Dapunta Hyang Sri Jayanasa. His name is mentioned in the early Siddhayatra inscriptions, which detail a sacred journey to obtain blessings alongside his military expansion into neighboring areas.

Between the 7th century to the early 11th century, Srivijaya rose as a thalassocratic (maritime) empire and later became a hegemon in Southeast Asia. Srivijaya controlled the Malay world until the Chola invasion led by Rajendra I around 1000 CE. Prior to the Chola incursions, Emperor Rajaraja I of Chola had initially established cordial relations with Srivijaya.

=== Conquest of Kedah, Jambi and other Malay kingdoms ===
As the young empire expanded, Srivijaya's conquests produced a significant period for interaction and cultural exchange. After successfully reaching the Malay world, Srivijaya became a trading power, later mastering their trade routes throughout the regional seas. Through invasions of southern Myanmar, the Malay Peninsula, and the Kra Isthmus, Srivijaya extended its regional influence.

One major conquest was the Srivijayan conquest of Kedah. During the war, the king of Kedah decided to surrender, and many of his forces faced heavy casualties. Local records unearthed in Kedah indicate that ancient Kedah's socio-political structure was decentralized. In contrast, Srivijayan socio-politics were highly structured: the ruler established a palace kraton in Sumatra, surrounded by chiefs known as datus who assisted in administering the kingdom and executing diplomatic functions. Archaeological findings and Indian records show that ancient Kedah was regularly visited by traders and its port functioned as an entrepôt. Through this system, Srivijaya organized ancient Kedah, transforming it into a Srivijayan "mandala". Srivijaya's conquest of Malay kingdoms like Kedah led to their gradual dissolution, starting between the 7th and 9th centuries and concluding by the 11th or 13th century. Between the 7th and late 8th centuries, Srivijaya annexed Langkasuka, an ancient Old Malay Hindu-Buddhist kingdom. Srivijaya subsequently conquered Pan Pan and Tambralinga on the Malay Peninsula during the same century.

From that time, Srivijayan expansion originated from Palembang in Sumatra and progressed northward into the Malay Peninsula. Undoubtedly, Srivijaya's influence controlled two major naval chokepoints – the Strait of Malacca and the Sunda Strait – and thus their key trade routes, leading the kingdom to become a significant trading empire with formidable naval forces.

=== Rivalry between Srivijaya and Mataram kingdoms ===
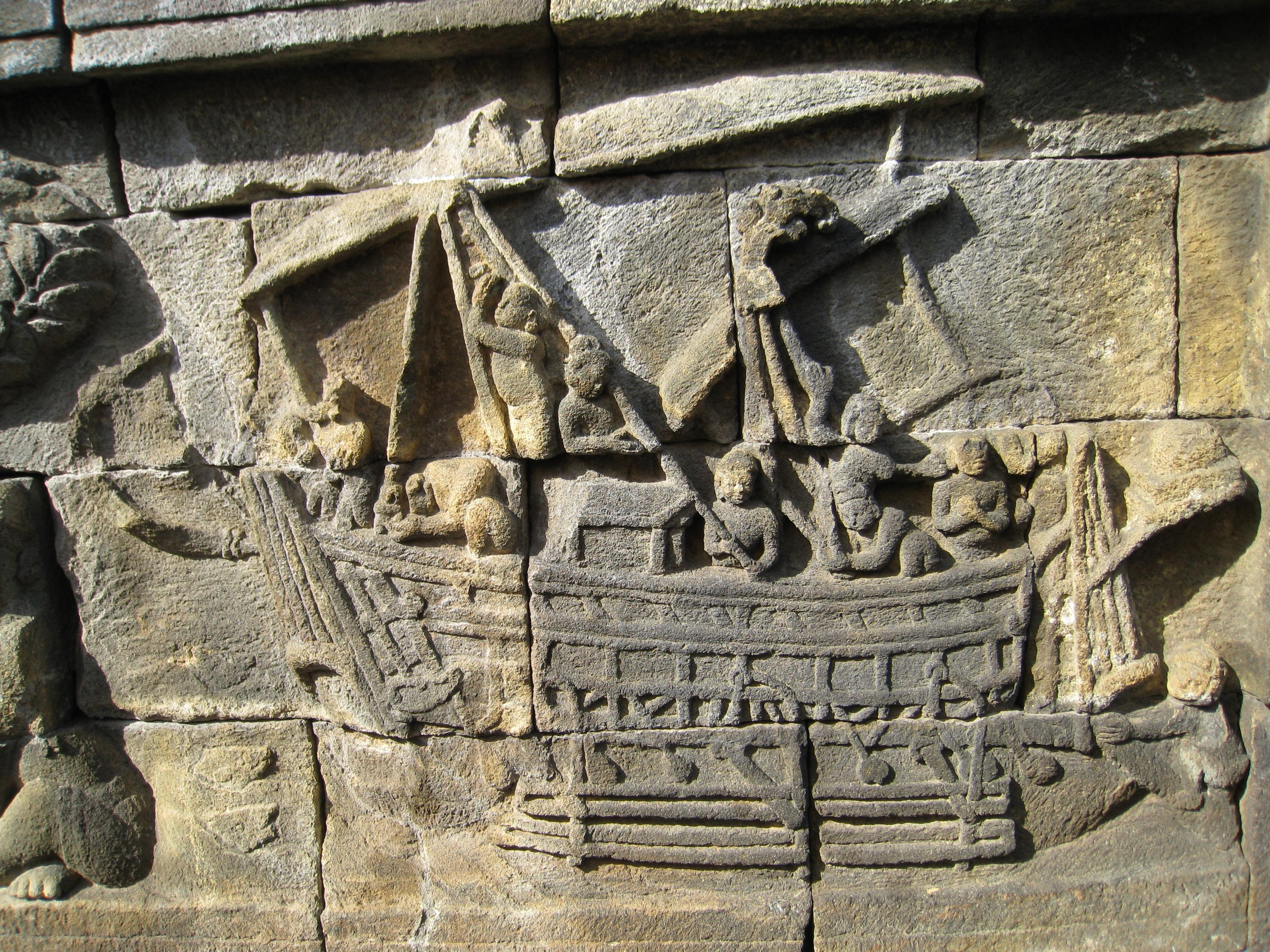
Stone relief at Borobudur depicting an ancient Javanese vessel

The Mataram Kingdom was a Hindu-Buddhist kingdom in inland Java that flourished between the 8th and 11th centuries. Around 929, the center of the kingdom shifted from Central Java to East Java. One proposed cause (Note: Many theories are proposed for this geographic shift. See Mataram kingdom.) of the move was a power struggle between the kingdoms of Mataram and Srivijaya. A partial rivalry existed between the two kingdoms.

In an attempt to capture the city of Palembang, King Dharmawangsa of the Mataram Isyana dynasty launched a naval invasion against Srivijaya in 990. In 992, Mataram forces temporarily captured Palembang, until Srivijaya detained the attacks and recaptured it.

Imperial Chinese accounts from the Song dynasty also record the Javanese invasion of Srivijaya. In 988, Srivijaya sent an envoy to the Chinese court. Two years later, the envoy journeyed to Canton (Guangzhou), learned of the Mataram attack on Srivijaya, and in spring 992 returned to the Chinese court to request imperial protection. That same year Mataram envoys also arrived to the Chinese court, corroborating the account and describing a continual war between Srivijaya and Mataram, though "they did not say [...] that the aggression came from Java."

==== Wurawari rebellion ====
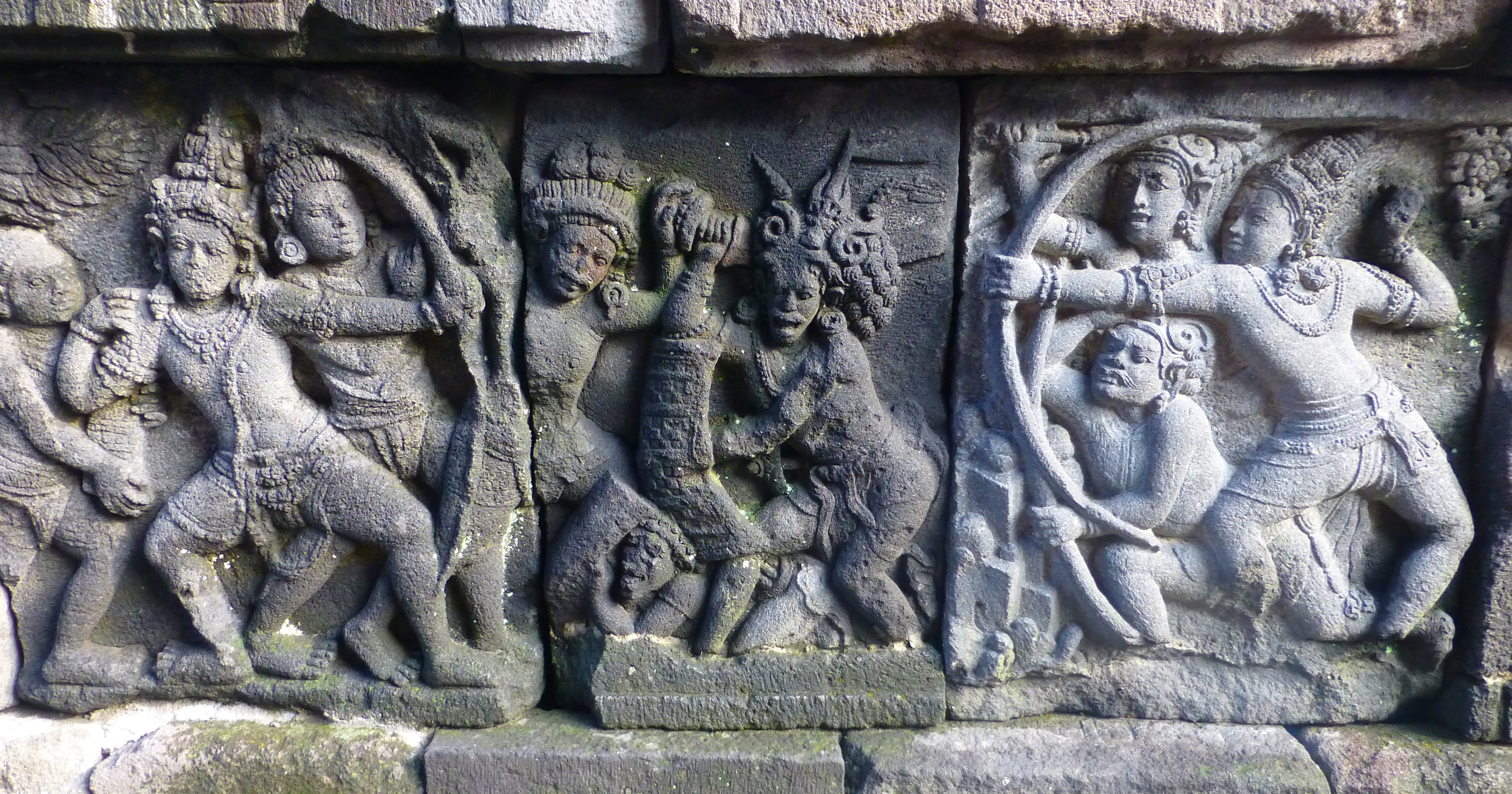
A battle scene depicted on a bas-relief in Prambanan

At peace with India and nominally protected by China, Srivijaya launched retaliatory attacks against Mataram in 1016. These attacks may have been limited to "provoking or supporting an internal revolt" in Mataram. The primary assailant was prince Aji of Wurarari, a vassal polity of Mataram. The prince wanted to marry Dharmawangsa's daughter and succeed him as the Mataram king. However, Dharmawangsa instead chose Airlangga of Bali as his son-in-law. Vengeful, the prince of Wurarari allied with Srivijaya to revolt and attack the Mataram palace. The sudden and unexpected attack took place during the wedding ceremony of Dharmawangsa's daughter. The attack led to the death of Dharmawangsa and the destruction of the capital. The events of 1016 are referred to as pralaya (Note: "the debacle"; "the death of the Mataram kingdom") (lit. 'destruction') in a Javanese inscription in Pucangan, which dates during the reign of King Airlangga of the later Kahuripan Kingdom (11th century).

=== Song–Srivijaya relations ===
The kingdom is referred to as "Shih-li-fo-shih" or "Sanfoqi" in Chinese chronicles dating from around the 12th century. Srivijaya first sent a tributary to the Song dynasty (960–1279) around the year of 670 M to 1380-an M. The Song dynasty was slightly involved in the collapse of Malay kingdoms during the Srivijayan expansions through Sumatra and then the Malay Peninsula.

While Srivijaya was annexing the Malay kingdoms, China experienced the Mongol invasion of the Song dynasty. The conquest of continental East Asia was one of the last great accomplishments of the Mongol Empire. Following the division of the Mongol Empire (1259), the Mongols ruled East Asia as the Han-style Yuan dynasty. The Song dynasty was finally disestablished when Kublai Khan defeated the Chinese Southern Song in 1279, putting all China under foreign rule for the first time. The disestablishment of the Song dynasty marked the end of relations between China and Srivijaya. (Note: Srivijaya had been already invaded by naval incursions led by the king of Chola Rajendra I, which led to the kingdom's decline.)

== Post-Srivijaya period ==
=== Chola invasion ===
The apex of Imperial Chola under Rajendra I rule, c. 1030

In 1006, King Maravijayattungavarman, a Srivijayan maharaja from the Sailendra dynasty, built the Chudamani Vihara in the port town of Nagapattinam, located in the modern-day Indian state of Tamil Nadu. Relations deteriorated under the reign of Chola emperor Rajendra I, as the Chola started attacking Srivijayan cities.

The Chola conquests in Southeast Asia broke Srivijaya's regional maritime monopoly, significantly weakening the kingdom. Several places in present-day Indonesia were invaded by the Cholas, which led to the fall of the Sailendra dynasty of Srivijaya. The Chola invasion coincided with the return voyage of the great Buddhist scholar Atiśa from Sumatra to India and Tibet in 1025.

=== Internal struggles and collapse ===
Following several major raids launched by the Cholas upon at their ports, the kingdom was disintegrated in 1025. Chinese sources continued referring to the polity as "Sanfoqi", but some historians argue the validity of this name after 1025, when Sanfoqi referred to Jambi. In 1068, due to the rise of Kedah on the Malay Peninsula, Srivijayan requested Chola assistance to vassalize Kedah, and Chola ruler became acting viceroy of Kedah before returning to India.

After its fall, the kingdom was largely forgotten. French historian George Cœdès formally postulated the kingdom's existence in 1918.

=== Emergence of new powers ===
Chandrabhanu (or Chandrabhanu Sridhamaraja) was a king of both Tambralinga and Jaffna (Javaka) who reigned 1230–1262. With his death, the Srivijaya Kingdom ended, according to the Siam Society historical sources. The histories of the Malay Peninsula and of Sumatra subsequently took separated courses. The city-states sent separate embassies to the Chinese court, which the Chinese recorded as coming from Sanfotsi.

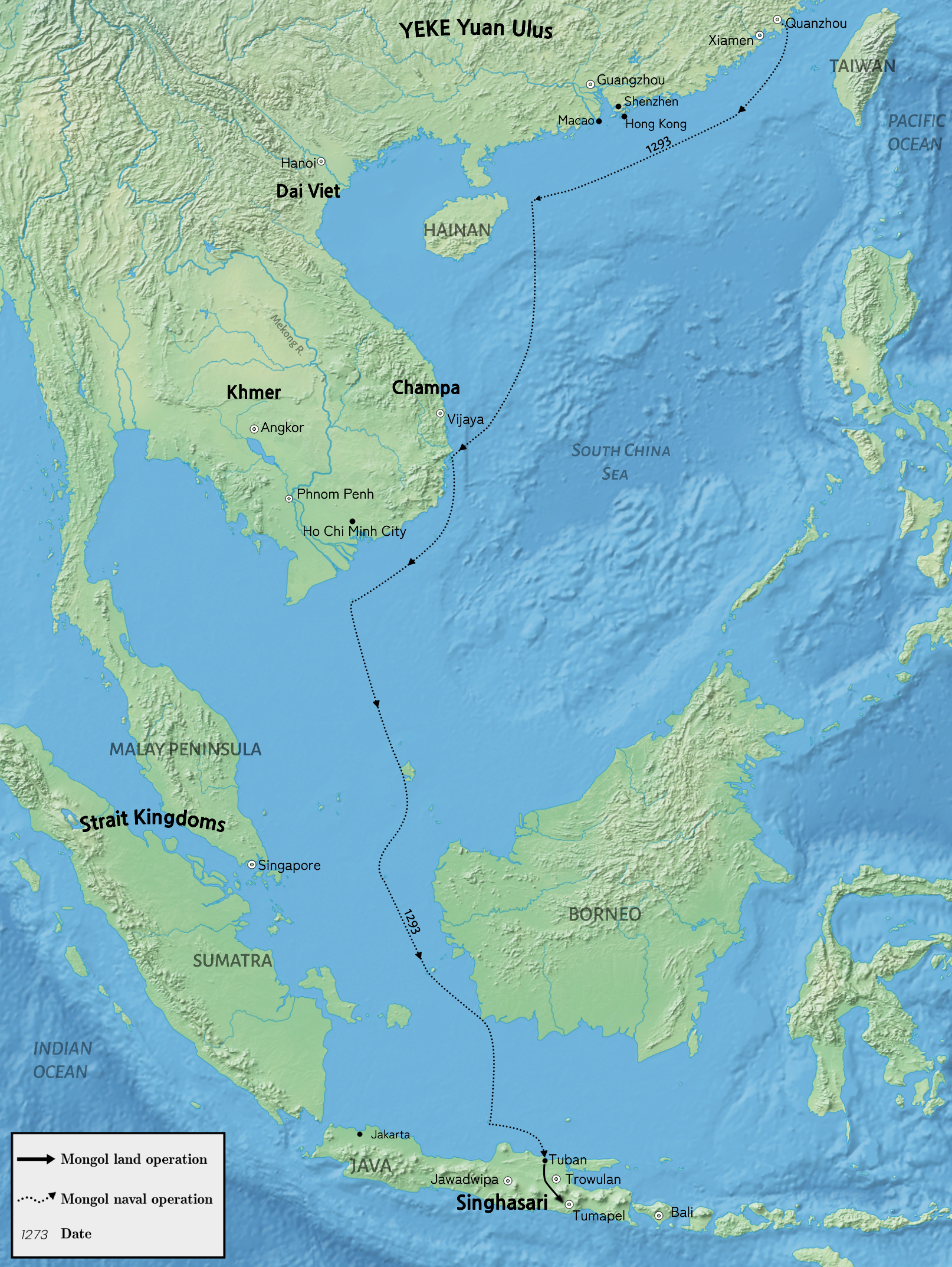
Map during Mongol invasion of Java

Majapahit rose after the fall of the Srivijaya Kingdom. At the time, Southeast Asia, and in particular Java, came under pressure from a Mongol-led invasion from China led by Yuan emperor Kublai Khan with an army about 20,000 to 30,000 soldiers. The invasion was a punitive expedition launched against the king of Singhasari, Kertanegara, who had refused to pay the tributes to Yuan. In the years between Kertanagara's refusal and the expedition arrival on Java, Kertanagara was killed and Singhasari had been usurped by the Kediri Kingdom. During the fierce campaign, Kediri surrendered. The invasion ended with a Yuan failure, after which Raden Wijaya founded the kingdom of Majapahit.

== Bibliography ==
- Mohd Nasir, Muhammad Nu'man; Ramli, Zuliskandar (September 2022). "ANCIENT KEDAH: A SRIVIJAYAN MANDALA IN THE MALAY PENINSULA" (PDF). Journal Archeology Malaysia. 35 (2). Malaysian Association of Archaeologists: 77–87. Archived from the original (PDF) on 6 September 2024.
- Chattopadhyaya, Alaka (1 May 1999). Atisa and Tibet: Life and Works of Dipamkara Srijnana in Relation to the History and Religion of Tibet with Tibetan Sources. Motilal Banarsidass, India. p. 624. ISBN 9788120809284.
- Chiraya Rajani, M.C. Chand. "Background to the Sri Vijaya Story Part V (Conclusion)" (PDF). The Siam Society. Chiangmai University.
- Bade, David W. (2013), Of Palm Wine, Women and War: The Mongolian Naval Expedition to Java in the 13th Century, Singapore: Institute of Southeast Asian Studies
