= Wawa of Mataram =

Historical Indonesian ruler

King of Mataram
- Reign: 924 – 929
- Predecessor: Rakai Layang Dyah Tulodong
- Successor: Rakai Hino Dyah Siṇḍok
- Born: Dyah Wawa
- Issue: Dyah Kbi
Regnal name
- Sri Maharaja Rakai Pangkaja Dyah Wawa Sri Wijayalokanamotungga
- House: Sanjaya
- Religion: Shivaist Hinduism

Sri Maharaja Rakai Pangkaja Dyah Wawa Sri Wijayalokanamottungga, better known in Indonesia as Dyah Wawa, was a ruler of the Mataram kingdom in Central Java, Indonesia (r. 924–929).

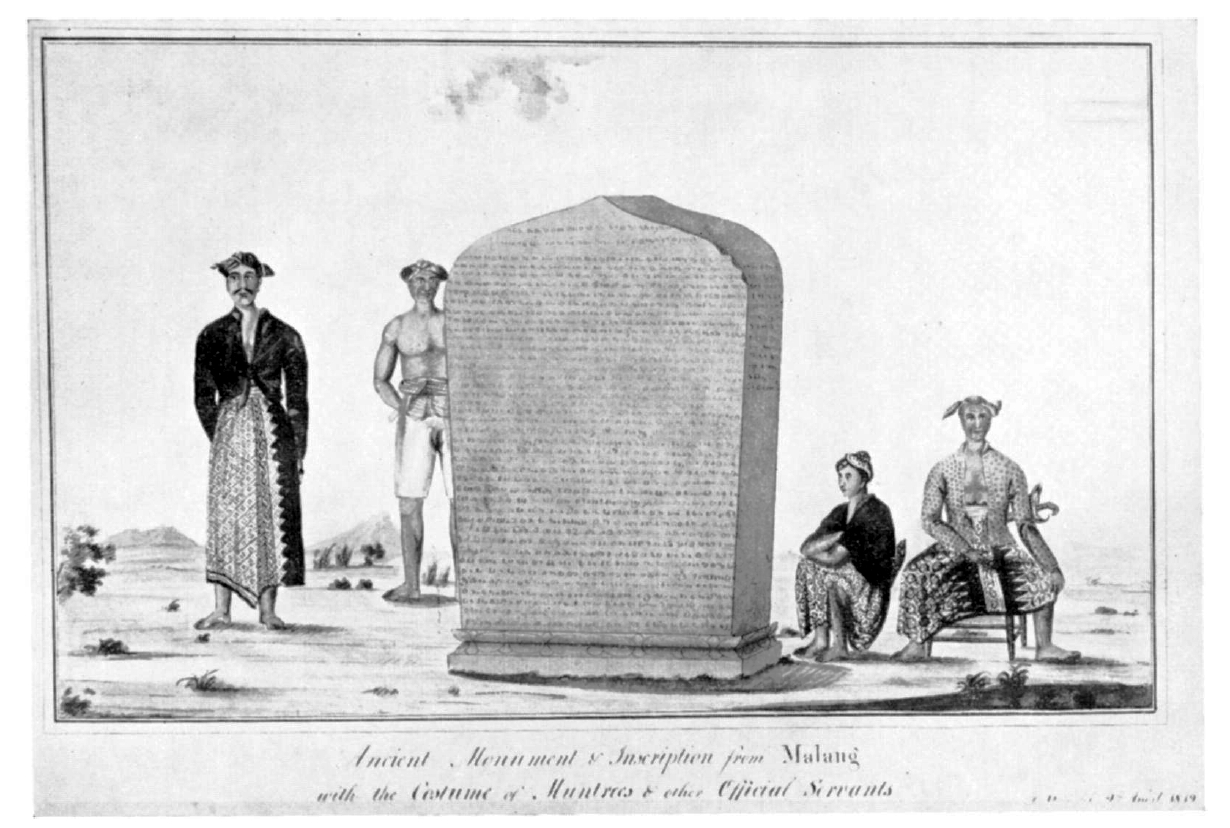
The so-called Minto Stone was 2 metres (6.6 ft) high and weighed 3.8 tons was found in "Ngendat" and described by Colin Mackenzie in 1811–14

What is known of him is mainly thanks to an inscription engraved on the Minto Stone.

Wawa's son-in-law and successor, Mpu Sindok (r. 929–947), moved the court of Mataram from Central Java to East Java in 929. The latter could have buried the former at Belahan Temple near Pasuruan in East Java.
