= Colin Mackenzie =

Madras Army officer and scholar (1754-1821)

Colonel Colin Mackenzie CB
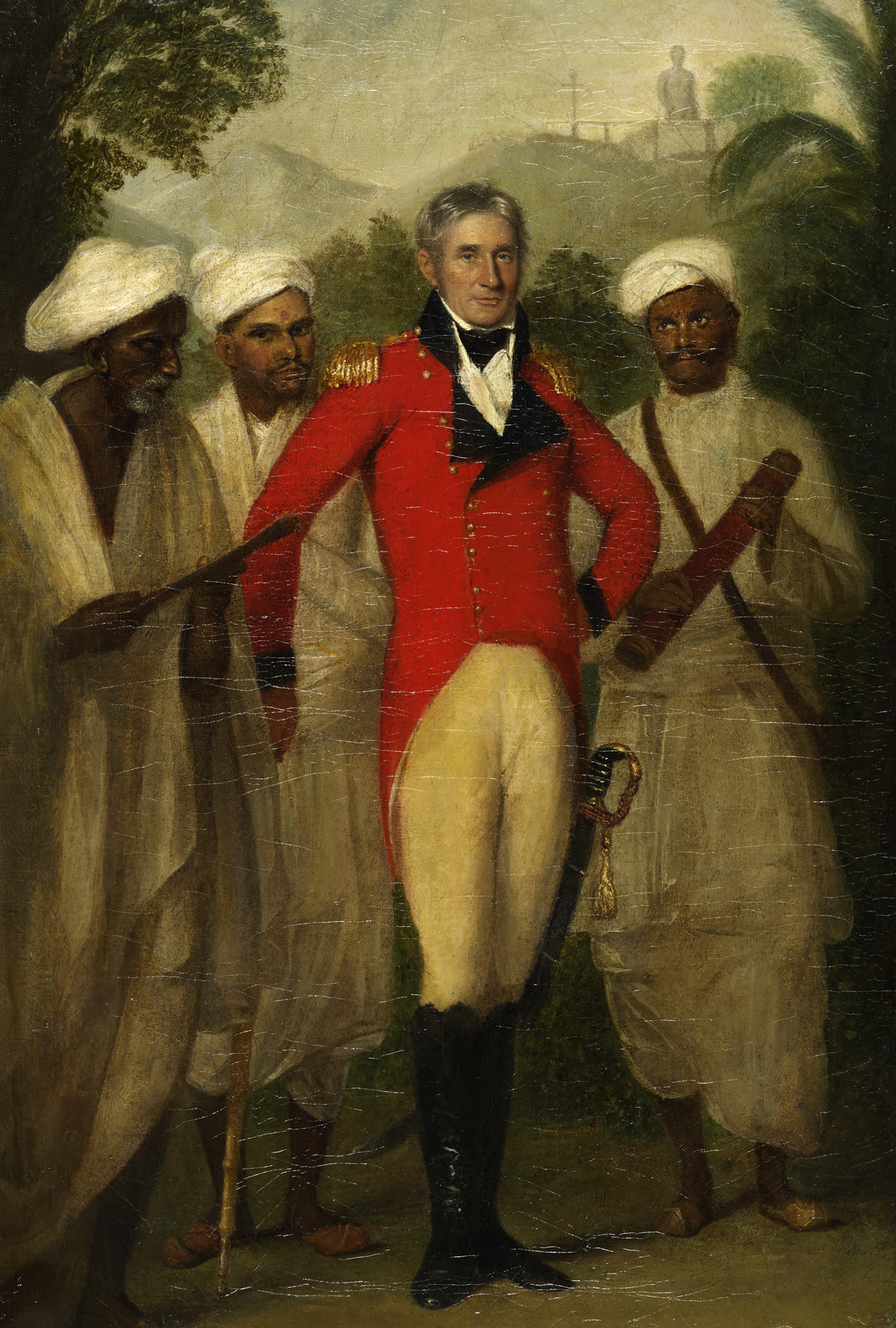
- Painting by Thomas Hickey (1816). Suggested identities of the persons from left to right are Dhurmia, a Jain pandit holding a palm-leaf manuscript, Cavelli Venkata Lechmiah, a Telugu Brahmin pandit, Colin Mackenzie in the red uniform of the East India Company and Kistnaji, a peon holding a telescope. The background was said by early commentators to be the statue of Gomateshwara at Shravanabelagola but Howes (2010) identifies it as Karkala. The hill to the left of the statue has a basket-and-pole used by the Great Trigonometrical Survey.

1st Surveyor General of India
- In office 1815–1821
- Preceded by: Office established
- Succeeded by: John Hodgson

Personal details
- Born: 1754 Stornoway, Scotland
- Died: 8 May 1821 (aged 63–64) Calcutta, Bengal Presidency, India
- Resting place: South Park Street Cemetery, Calcutta
- Spouse: Petronella Jacomina Bartels (m. 1812)

Military service
- Allegiance: East India Company
- Branch/service: Madras Army
- Rank: Colonel
- Battles/wars: French Revolutionary Wars; Siege of Pondicherry; Fourth Anglo-Mysore War; Siege of Seringapatam

Colonel Colin Mackenzie CB (1754 – 8 May 1821) was a Madras Army officer and scholar in the British East India Company who later became the first Surveyor General of India. He was a collector of antiquities, an orientalist and an indologist. He surveyed southern India, making use of local interpreters and scholars to study religion, oral histories, inscriptions and other evidence, initially out of personal interest, and later as a surveyor. He was ordered to survey the Mysore region shortly after the British victory over Tipu Sultan in 1799 and produced the first maps of the region along with illustrations of the landscape and notes on archaeological landmarks. His collections consisting of thousands of manuscripts, inscriptions, translations, coins and paintings, which were acquired after his death by the India Office Library, are an important source for the study of Indian history. He was appointed Companion of the Order of the Bath on 4 June 1815.

== Early life ==
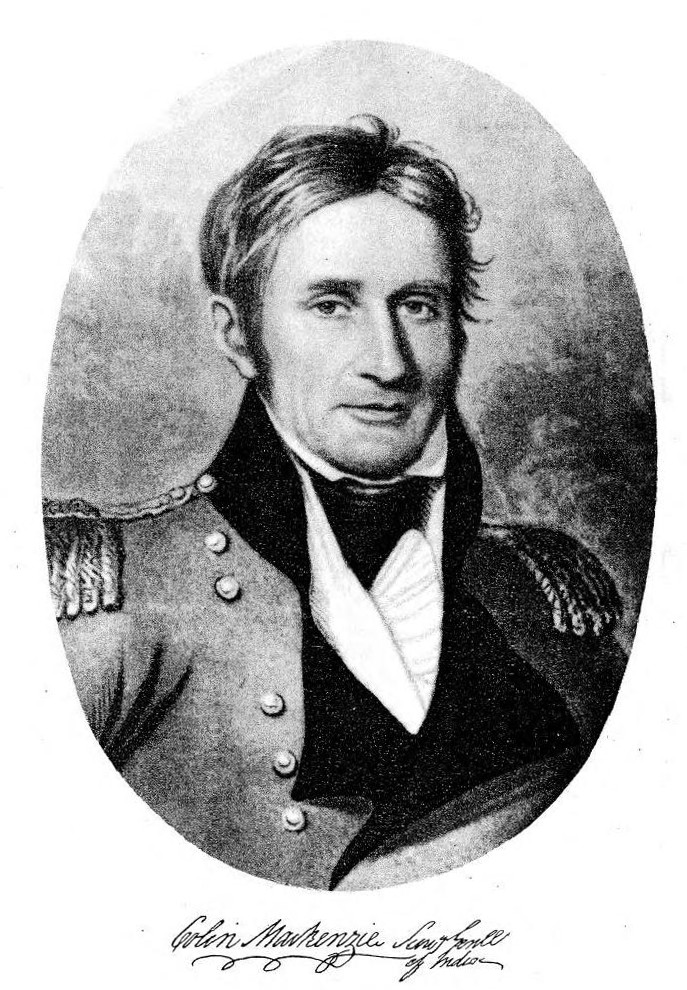
Crop from Thomas Hickey's painting

Colonel Colin Mackenzie was born in Stornoway on Lewis, Outer Hebrides, Scotland, the second son of merchant Murdoch Mackenzie (who was the first postmaster of the town) and Barbara around 1753 or 1754. Little is known of his early life but he is thought to have started his work as a Comptroller of the Customs at Stornoway from 1778 to 1783, possibly through the influence of his father's association with the Mackenzie Earls of Seaforth. In his youth he had an interest in mathematics possibly fostered by his schoolmaster, a freemason, Alexander Anderson. Lord Kenneth Mackenzie (last Earl of Seaforth) and Francis (fifth Lord Napier) sought his help in preparing a biography of John Napier and his work on logarithms. When Lord Napier died in 1773, Kenneth Mackenzie helped Colin to obtain commission with the British East India Company to join the Madras Army. When he arrived in Madras on 2 September 1783 he was thirty and was never to return home again. He went to India as a volunteer in the 78th Seaforth Highlanders, joined in India as a Cadet in the Infantry division but transferred in 1786 as a Cadet of Engineers.

== India ==
Arriving in India he first met the daughter of Lord Francis Napier, Hester (d. 1819). Hester was married to Samuel Johnston who worked as a civil servant at Madurai (their son Alexander Johnston later became a judge in Sri Lanka, founded the Royal Asiatic Society of Great Britain and Ireland and wrote a memoir on the life of Colin Mackenzie). Hester introduced Mackenzie to some Brahmins to obtain information on Hindu mathematical traditions as part of the biographical memoir on John Napier and the history of logarithms. The biography project appears to have been subsequently dropped but Colin continued to take an interest in antiquities.

For the first thirteen years in India, he was busy with military duties. He began in Coimbatore and Dindigul around 1783 followed by engineering duties in Madras, Nellore and Guntur and during the campaign against Mysore from 1790 to 1792. In 1793 he saw action in the Siege of Pondicherry. He was posted as a commanding engineer to Ceylon and returned in 1796. He rose in rank starting from a second lieutenant on 16 May 1783, first lieutenant on 6 March 1789; and captain 16 August 1793. Major by 1 Jan 1806 rising on to become a colonel on 12 August 1819. It was after his return from Ceylon that he was able to follow his interest in antiquities.

=== Mysore survey ===
In 1799, Mackenzie was part of the British force in the Battle of Seringapatam, where Tipu Sultan, Sultan of Mysore was defeated. After the defeat of Tipu, he led the Mysore survey between 1799 and 1810 and one of the aims was to establish the boundaries of the state as well as the territories ceded by the Nizam. The survey consisted of interpreters, a team of draftsmen and illustrators who collected material on the natural history, geography, architecture, history, customs, and folk tales of the region. There were also some surveyors who had been trained by Michael Topping at the surveying school in Madras. Some of these surveyors came from the Madras Orphan Asylum including William Lantwar, John Gould, John Mustie and John Newman. Another of Mackenzie's assistant was Benjamin Swain Ward who had trained in England.

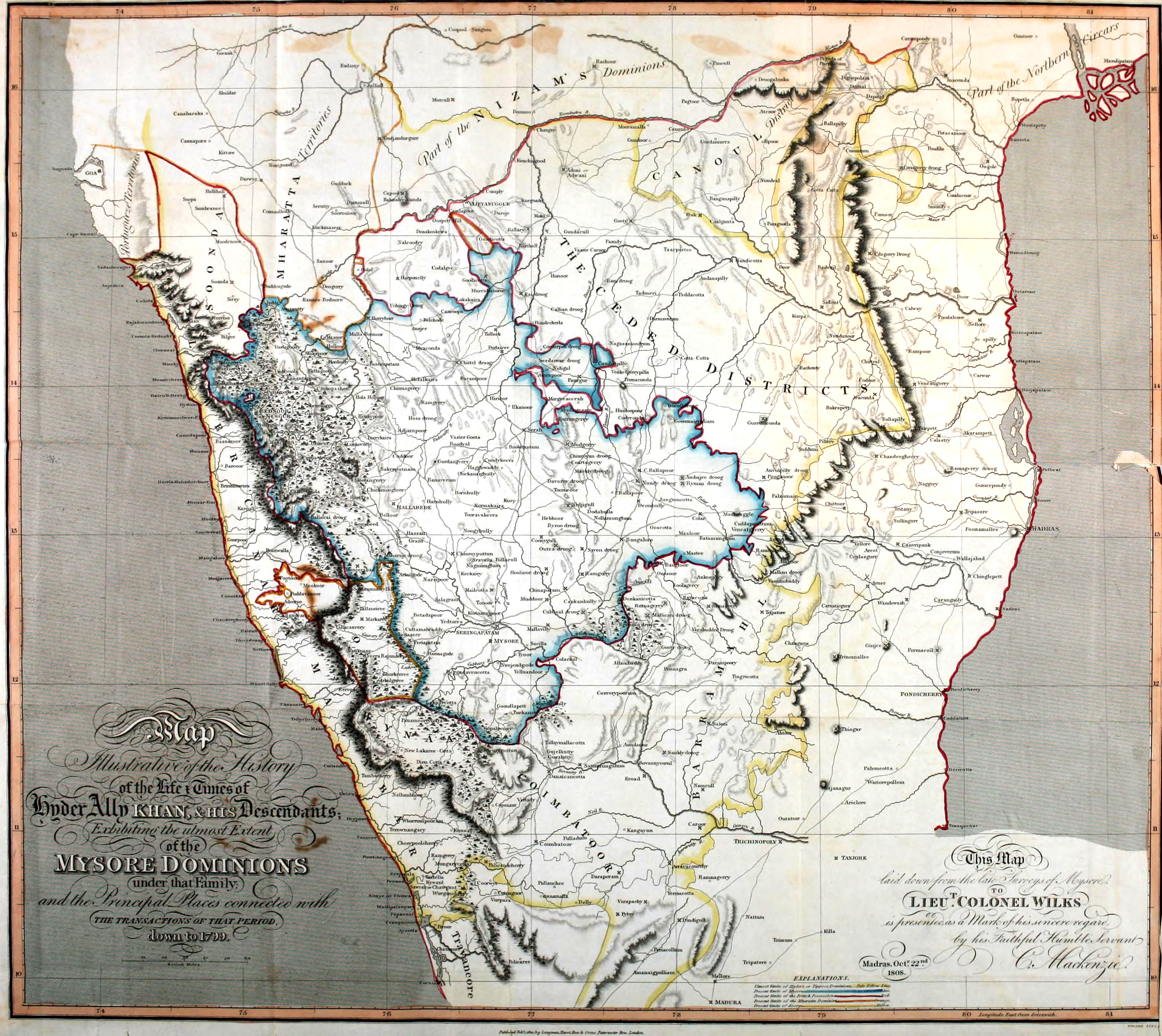
Mackenzie's map of southern India (1808)

When he began the survey, he was concerned that he had no linguistic skills and was more appalled by the lack of British competence in south Indian languages. Around the same time, the trigonometric survey was proposed by William Lambton but there was little collaboration between the two during the Mysore survey. Mackenzie was told that his survey was not to be "mere military or geographical information, but that your enquiries are to be extended to a statistical account of the whole country." However he was not provided enough resources for this grand plan. He wrote to Barry Close that he would not "descend to the minutiae" of measuring cultivated and uncultivated land but would instead focus on that which was of political and military importance. He pointed out that enquiries into revenues created uneasiness. One of his chief interpreters was a Niyogi Brahmin named Kavelli Venkata Boria (IAST kāvelī veṃkeṭā boraiyāḥ, there are variations in spelling) who Mackenzie first met in 1796, shortly after his return from Ceylon. He found Boria capable of dealing with all sects and considered him as "the first step of my introduction into the portal of Indian knowledge." Boria knew Tamil, Telugu, Kannada and Sankskrit. In 1797, Mackenzie visited Mudgeri and found the ruins of a Jain temple. He wrote an extensive note on the Jains based on interviews through his translator "Cavelly Boria". Boria died in 1803 and Mackenzie took in his brother Venkata Lechmiah (IAST lakṣmaiyyā, also spelt Lakshmaiah or Lakshmayya). Another of Mackenzie's assistant was Dhurmiah (IAST dharmayāḥ), a Jain pandit (scholar) from Maleyur, then in Mysore State. Dhurmiah, with his ability to read Hale Kannada (old Kannada) inscriptions contributed greatly to the study of the inscriptions in the region. Dhurmiah provided Mackenzie with Jain insights into the history of India but some ideas were considered too unreliable such as the idea that the Jains had fled from Mecca. Dhurmiah's son may also have been on Mackenzie's staff. Another orientalist, Mark Wilks interviewed Dhurmiah and wrote on the Jains in his 1817 Historical Sketches of the South of India.

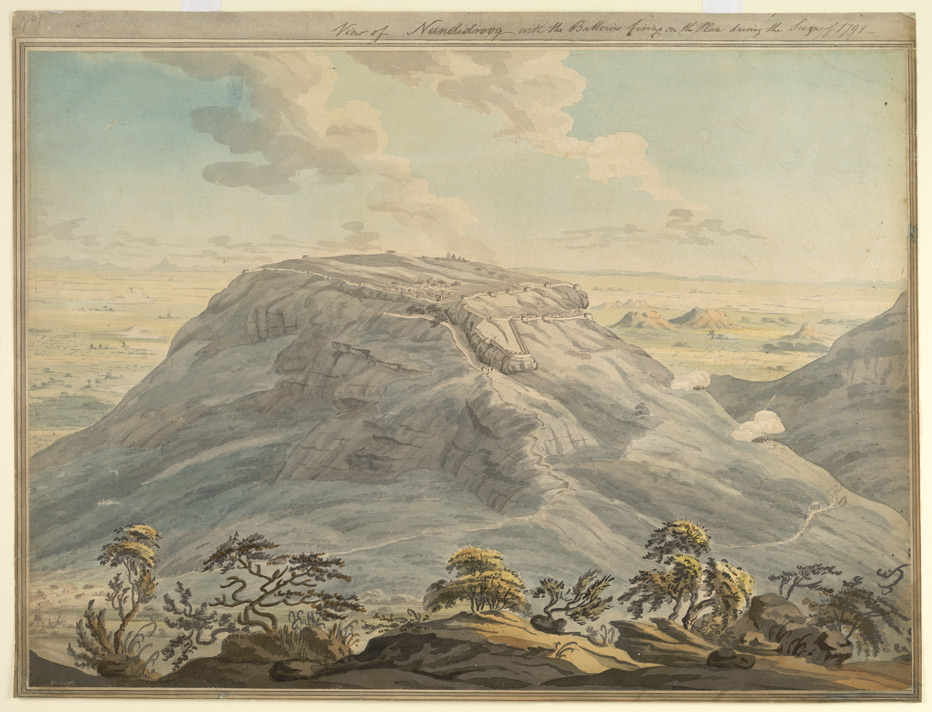
Watercolour from the Mackenzie collection showing Nandidrug in October 1791 with the batteries firing. The positions of the batteries was decided by Mackenzie and Lord Cornwallis commended Mackenzie for his role in the victory over Tipu Sultan.

Stating the aims of his survey, he wrote from the perspective of a historian in a letter to Major Merwick Shawe in 1805:

The elucidation of the History of the several Governments that have rapidly succeeded in this Stage will I conceived be very interesting, as by the Inscriptions, Grants & other Documents that came into my hands, a regular Progress is traced up to the first Mahomedan invasion in the 13th Century & even beyond it to the 8th but more obscurely; & in several instances still further, these consist not merely of a dry Chain of uninteresting facts but are connected by various illustrations of the genious & manner of the People, their Several Systems of Government & of Religion, & of the predominant causes that influence their Sentiments & opinions to this day; lights are derived on the Tenures of lands, the origin & variety of the several classes, and the genius and Spirit of the Government prevalent generally in the South for centuries from Several Documents illustrating claims & pretension not foreign to modern discussions; ... confirming the utility of this undertaking to the existing Government from a knowledge of Institutions that influence so considerable a part of the Population of the Empire.

=== Amaravati ===
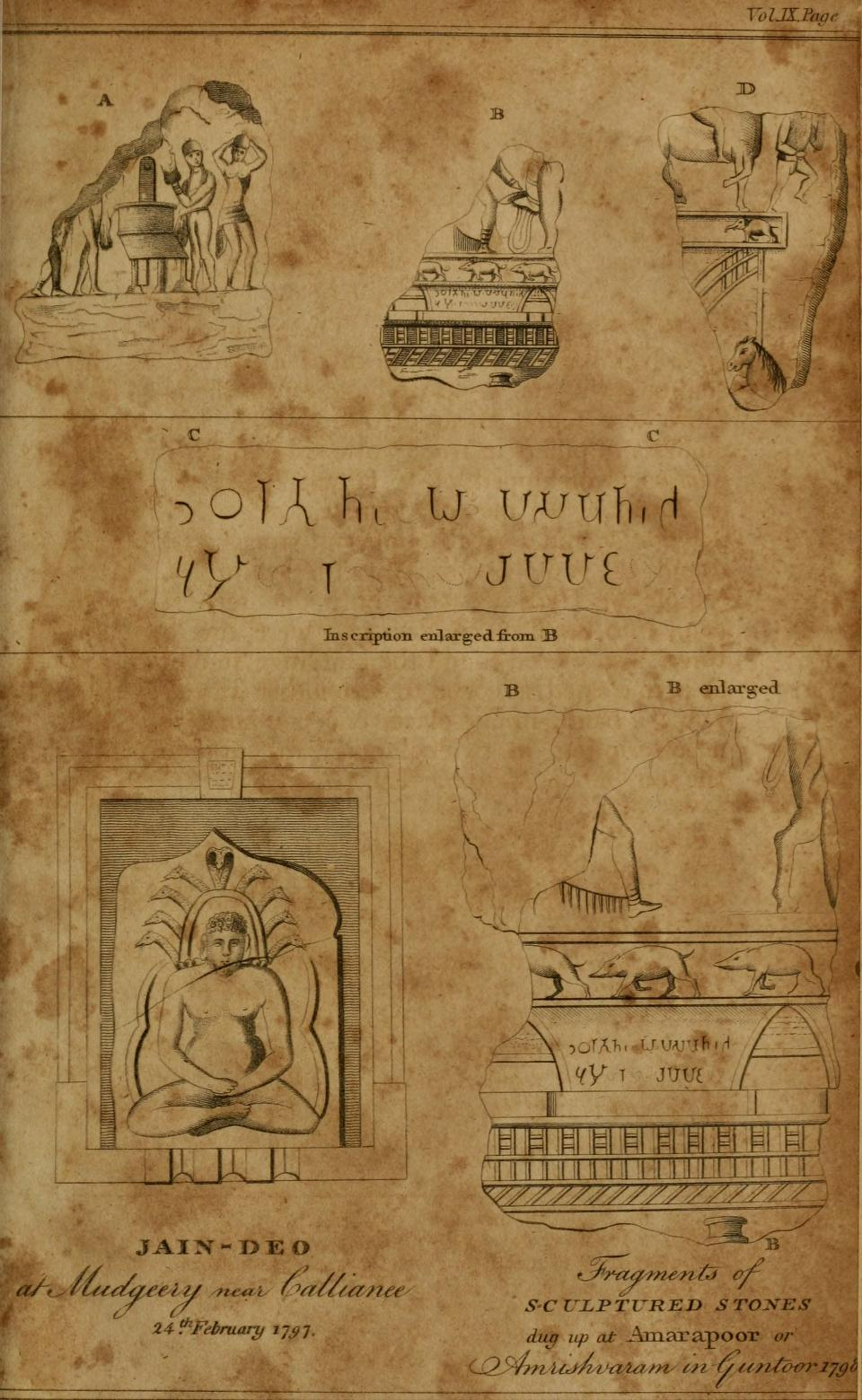
Inscriptions in Mudgeri and at Amaravati (1809)

Among Mackenzie's vast collection of illustrations is a set of 85 sketches made at Amaravati. He appears to have first visited the site in 1798 and conducted more systematic studies between 1816 and 1820 after he became a Surveyor General and three copies of these documents were made. One was deposited at the Library of the Asiatic Society, Calcutta, another at Madras and one in the British Library at London. Only the London copy survives. Sketches of the site were made by John Newman, draftsman for Mackenzie from 1810 to 1818. About 132 stones were found by Mackenzie but these are no longer traceable. Mackenzie believed that the site was related to the Jain religion and had no idea of Buddhism in India. The stones from Amaravati were brought to Masulipatam but many were not taken to ship but deposited into a mound that came to be known as "Robertson's Mound" after Francis W. Robertson who was Assistant Collector at Masulipatnam from 1814 to 1817. Most of these were subsequently moved to the Madras Museum along with Sir Walter Elliot's collections from Amaravati. About 79 stones depicted in the Mackenzie drawings are unaccounted for and are not traceable to collections in museums.

== Java ==
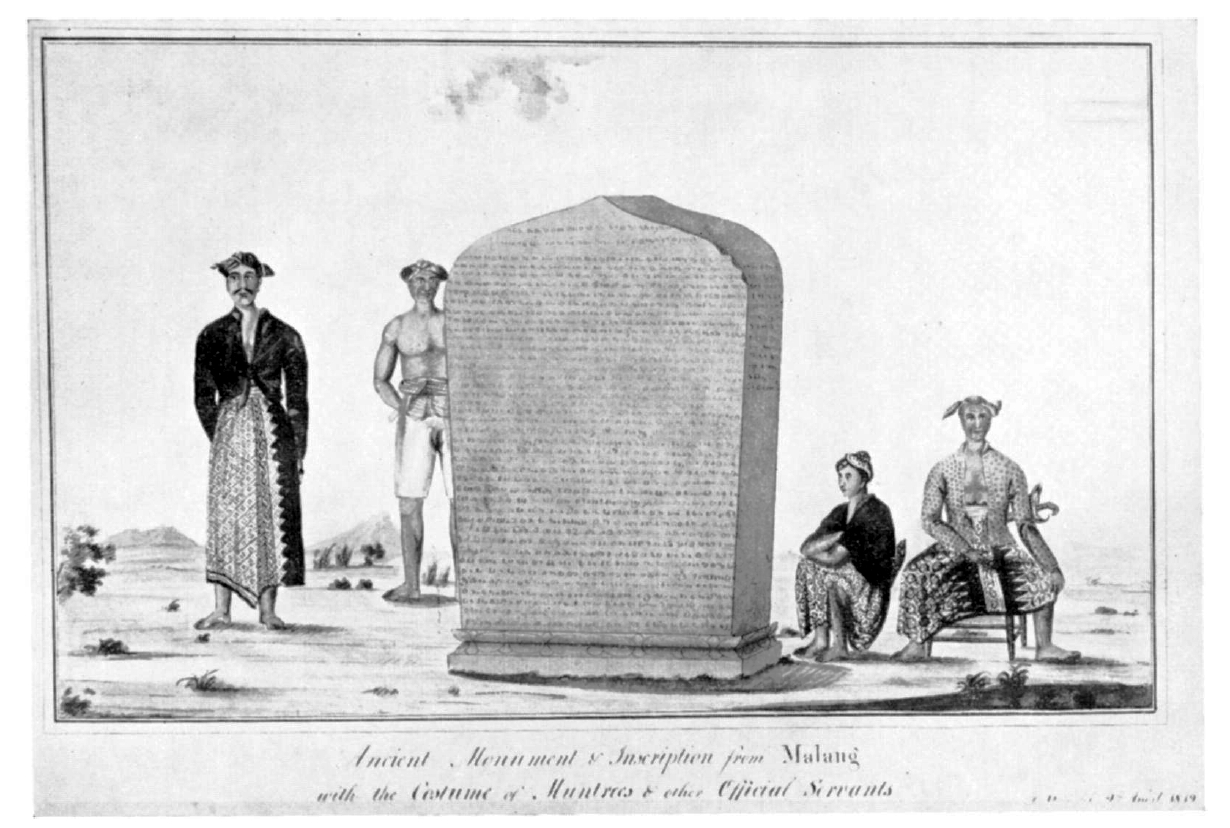
This inscription was found at Ngendat near Malang and gifted by Raffles to Lord Minto who took it back home and now goes by the name of Minto Stone.

Mackenzie spent two years (1811-1812/13) in Java, during the period of British occupation during the Napoleonic Wars. On 18 November 1812, while in Java, he married Petronella Jacomina Bartels at a local Lutheran Church. Petronella was born in Ceylon and was of Dutch ancestry. In 1814, Stamford Raffles having heard of Mackenzie's work in India, wanted him to survey Java and report on its monuments. Since Mackenzie had then moved back to India, the team was led by H. C. Cornelius (who had accompanied Mackenzie earlier) who was also responsible for the work involved in removing the debris from the buried ruins of Borobodur. His report on the survey of Java included many watercolours illustrating life during that period. These were published in three volumes. The first was titled Antiquities & Costume(s) of Java, 1812-13 and includes drawings and sketches some of which were made use of by Raffles in his History of Java. The second volume bore the title A Collection of Monuments, Images, Sculptures &c. illustrative of The Ancient History, Religion & Institutions of the Island of Java and of the Adjacent Isles: Taken under the immediate Inspection & Direction of Lieutenant Colonel Colin Mackenzie in the course of a Tour & of different Excursions through the Island of Java in the years 1811-1812 & 1813 and included numerous sketches and a few watercolours. The third volume Views, Plans and Maps on the Island of Java carried some pencil drawn maps.

== Surveyor General of India ==
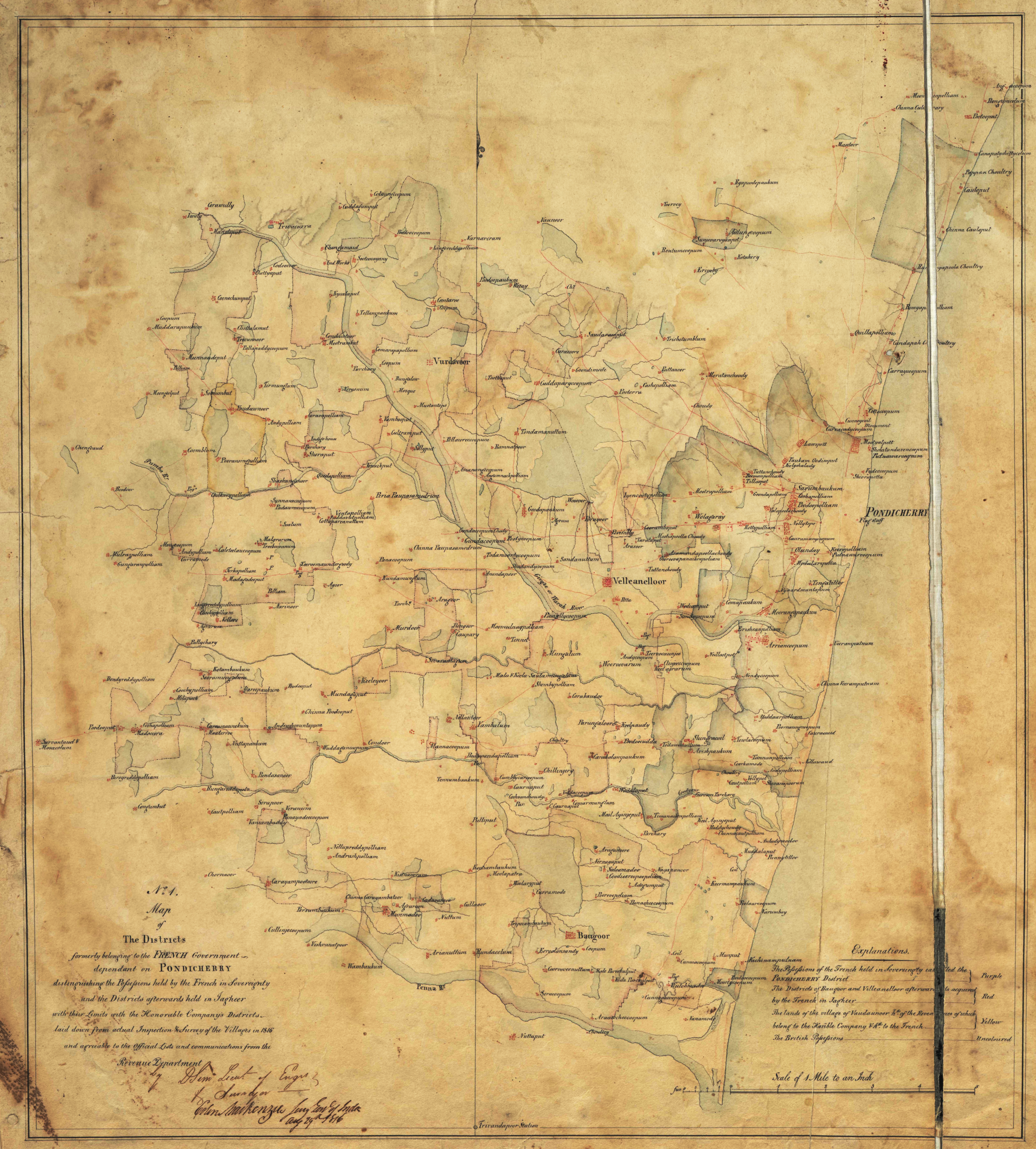
1816 map of Pondicherry signed by Colin Mackenzie (National Archives of India)

In 1767, the East India Company under Lord Clive had appointed James Rennell as Surveyor General for Bengal. Colin Mackenzie was appointed Surveyor General of Madras Presidency in 1810 but these posts were abolished in 1815. After his returning to India, in June 1815, he was invested as a Companion of the Bath. He returned to continue surveys of eastern India from the Krishna to Cape Comorin. On 26 May 1815 he was appointed Surveyor General of India with his headquarters at Fort William in Calcutta but he was allowed to stay on in Madras to help reorganize the surveys. He stayed there till May 1817 during which period he worked on planning surveys and examining earlier surveys. He appointed Benjamin Swain Ward (1786–1835) to survey Travancore, Lieutenant Peter Eyre Conner (born 5 August 1789, died 29-April-1821 at Hyderabad) (Sometimes given only as Lt. Connor) for Coorg (then written as Codugu or Koorg), Francis Mountford (1790–1824) to Guntur and James Garling (1784–1820) to the Nizam's territories. By 1816 Garling had used a triangulation system similar to that of Lambton to work out the position of the ruins of Bijapur and was moving northwards. While Garling's work was appreciated by the surveyors of Bombay, he was rebuked by Mackenzie whose orders restricted him to the Nizam's territory. The government in an attempt to hasten his move to Calcutta sent the yacht, HC Phoenix to transport him and his family from Madras on 24 June 1816. The captain, Criddle, was ordered to take him to survey the Pulicat and Shoals before taking him to Calcutta. Mackenzie however set about to his work and did not board the yacht. The government then wrote that he should use the survey ship Sophia which was to bring Sir John Malcolm to Madras in May 1817. He finally set sail to Calcutta on 17 July 1817 aboard Sophia. When Mackenzie moved from Madras to Calcutta, Lechmiah was retained.

== Death and after ==
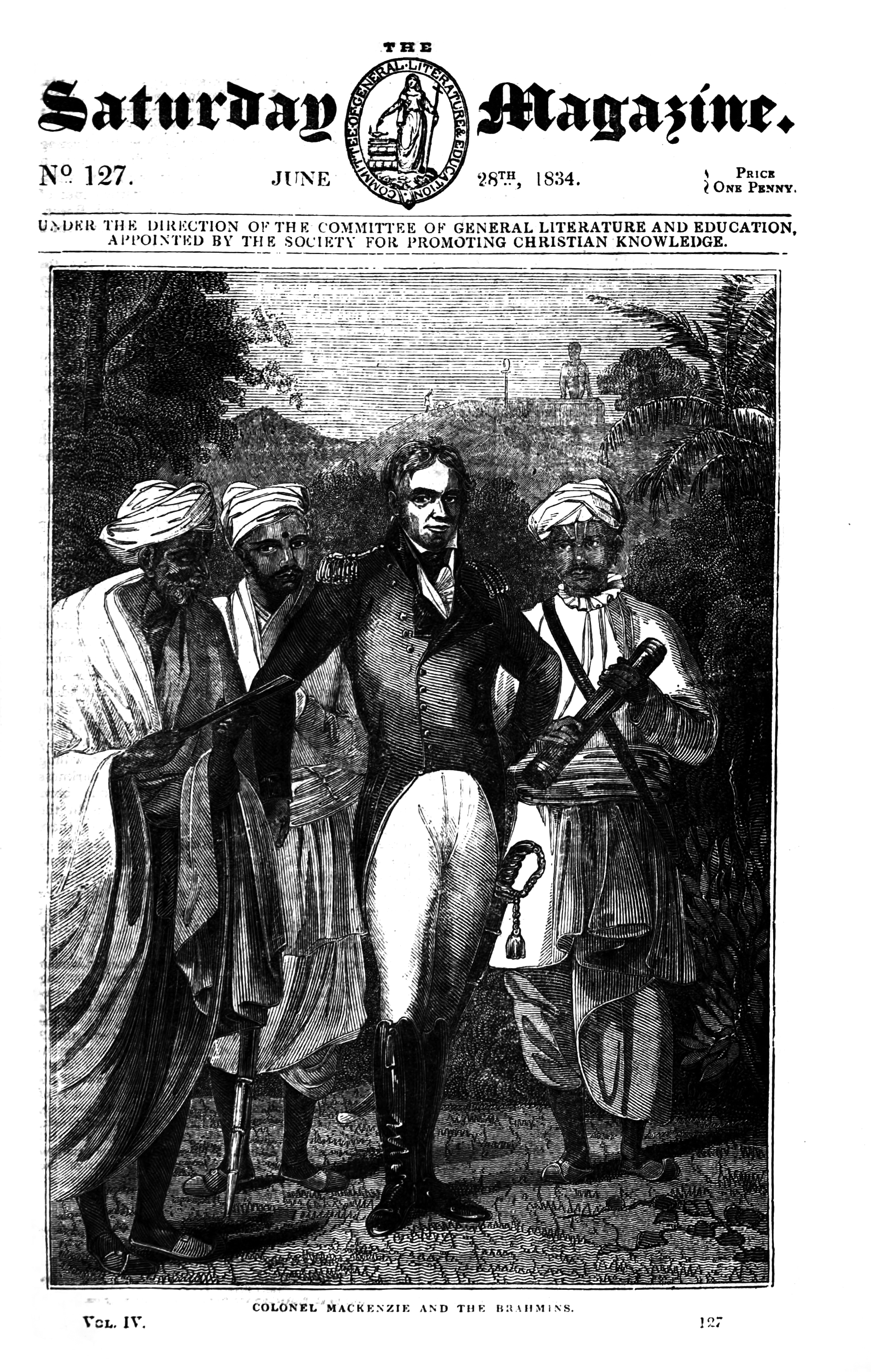
Cover of Saturday Magazine 28 June 1834 carrying Sir Alexander Johnston's evidence placed before a Committee of the House of Commons

He died on 8 May 1821 at his home in Calcutta, India, and was buried in South Park Street Cemetery. His widow, Petronella, offered the collections to the Bengal Government at a tentative price of Rs 20,000. The law firm Palmer and co. did an assessment of the collections and arrived at a figure of Rs 100,000 as a 'reasonable reimbursement' and the Bengal Government acquired the collections. In 1823 Petronella married Lt. Robert Page Fulcher at the Cape of Good Hope. Fulcher was a fellow traveller on the ship to England and her original plan was to move to Stornoway to live with Colin's sister. Mackenzie's Will left 5% to Lechmiah. Much of his collection of documents, manuscripts, artifacts, and artworks is now in the British Museum and the Oriental and India Office Collections of the British Library, though part of it remains in the Government Museum in Madras. Samuel and Hester Johnston's son, Sir Alexander Johnston, wrote a memoir on the life of Colin Mackenzie.

After Mackenzie's death, Lechmiah continued to help Horace Hayman Wilson in cataloguing the collections. He applied to the Madras division of the Asiatic Society to continue work on the collections made by his master. This was rejected on the grounds that no oriental could handle the managerial and critical work. James Prinsep declared that "..The qualifications of Cavelly Venkata for such an office, judging of them by his 'abstract,' or indeed of any native, could hardly be pronounced equal to such a task...". Lechmiah was the only Indian admitted to the Madras Literary Society which was founded in 1817 and in 1833, Lechmiah founded a parallel Madras Hindu Literary Society as a means of continuing his work. Sir Alexander Johnston supported this venture which also got the support of Captain Henry Harkness (author of a book on Indian scripts) and George Norton (a radical Advocate-General who was against government support for Christian missionaries support for but this organization did not survive long. A missionary in Madras, William Taylor was chosen for the job. Taylor has been described as a poor scholar (with a defective knowledge of the Devanagari script) if not a deranged antiquarian by Dirks (1993). Lechmiah received a monthly pension of 300 rupees and was given a grant of a Shotrium (or Shrotrium), land given as a reward for Civil officers. Three other brothers Ramaswamy (Ramasawmy), Narasimhalu (Naraseemoloo) and Sitayya (Seetiah) also worked for Mackenzie but the latter two were mainly as minor assistants. Ramaswamy later published extensively in English. His works included a book on the cities of the Deccan (Descriptive and Historical Sketches of Cities and Places in the Dekkan...), a biography of Deccan poets (1829), a cookbook translated in 1836 from a Telugu book written by Saraswati Bai (Pakasastra, otherwise Called Soopasastra, or the Modern Culinary Receipts of the Hindoos), a book on caste in 1837.

Studies of the maps made by Mackenzie's survey are considered to have the potential to highlight interesting archaeological sites as well as provide information on the organization and structure of poligar chiefdoms which were dismantled after British takeover.

Government offices
Preceded by Office established	Surveyor General of India; 1815–1821	John Hodgson
