= Benjamin Heyne =

German botanist, naturalist and surgeon

Benjamin Heyne FLS (1770, Pirna, Döbra – 6 February 1819, Madras) was a German botanist, naturalist, and surgeon who worked in British India as a botanist to Samalkot in the Madras Presidency under the British East India Company. He collected and described plants from southern India, many of which were named after him by European botanists.

== Life and work in India ==
Benjamin Heyne was born in Döbra, Germany. In later life, Heyne joined the Tranquebar Mission run by Moravians where he took an interest in the botanical gardens. Through William Roxburgh he obtained a position in the Madras Presidency as a botanist at Samalkot around 1794. In July 1794 Colin Mackenzie was looking for a botanist to join his Mysore surveys and in July 1798, Heyne met Mackenzie at Hyderabad. Mackenzie appointed Heyne as a botanist for the Mysore Survey in 1799. Heyne however repeatedly took sick leave, choosing to stay in Bangalore. This led Mackenzie to drop him by 1802. Heyne however found work in Bangalore and was involved in introducing new food plants to overcome famines and these included potatoes and breadfruit. After the fall of Tipu Sultan, he was appointed to look for a new site for a botanical garden in Mysore and he chose Lalbagh. He moved many specimens from Samalkot to Lalbagh. He was formally titled "Naturalist and Botanist" in 1802. Heyne made an observation in 1815 that Bryophyllum calycinum was more acidic in taste in the morning than in the afternoon, among the earliest observations on Crassulacean acid metabolism.

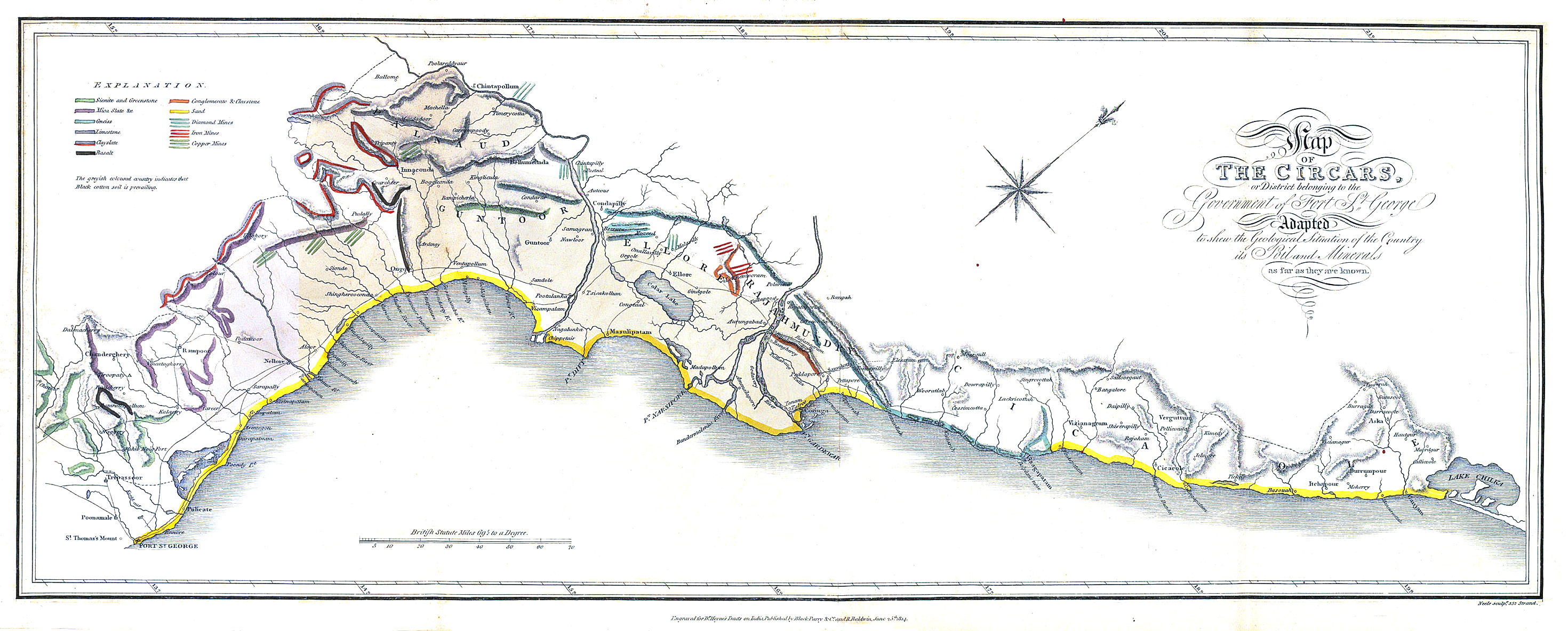
Geological map of the Circars, 1814. One of the oldest geological maps of India.

Heyne married Charlotte Rebecca, daughter of L.C. Topander of Jaganaikepuram in May 1803. A mistress, Mrs Maria Clasina Heyne is recorded of having died at Hyderabad on 9 April 1809 while his wife Charlotte died in Bangalore on 29 July 1816. Heyne died at Vepery.

== Bangalore collections ==
In 1800, after the fall of Mysore, the Lalbagh botanical garden at Bangalore was appropriated by the British East India Company "as a depository for useful plants sent from different parts of the country". Heyne, the Company's botanist at Madras, was ordered by the Governor-General, Richard Wellesley to accompany the Surveyor, with the following instructions:

"A decided superiority must be given to useful plants over those which are merely recommended by their rarity or their beauty,... to collect with care all that is connected with the arts and manufacturers of this country, or that promises to be useful in our own; to give due attention to the timber employed in the various provinces of his route,... and to collect with particular diligence the valuable plants connected with his own immediate profession, i.e. medicine."

An important task assigned to the colonial botanical gardens was dealing with malaria, the largest obstacle to colonial expansion. Heyne was placed in charge of the Lalbagh botanical garden till 1812. He did a great deal of collecting at Coimbatore and Bangalore and compiled a large collection of plant specimens which were forwarded to London. He collected more than 350 species from the Western Ghats and more than 200 species were named by him. He sent about 1500 of his Indian botanical specimens to the German botanist Albrecht Wilhelm Roth, whose work Novae plantarum species praesertim Indiae orientali (a book of Indian flora) is largely based on Heyne's botanical specimens.

== Mysore survey ==
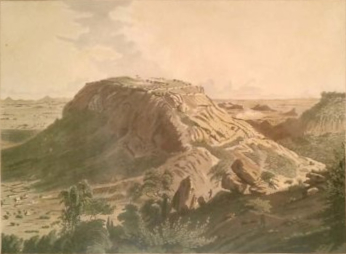
North West View of Nandydroog

Benjamin Heyne was assistant to Francis Buchanan on his Mysore Survey. He recorded in his Journal, his visits to sites with Col. Colin Mackenzie : "To Sautgur Hill (near Conjeeveram) with Mackenzie. Of the Sienite, they made formerly Cannon balls of which many are found lying all over the Hill." and at Nandydroog which was: "this morning cloathed with a white fog, when the rest of the country was Clear. The country hereabouts pretty well cultivated. Yesterday morning was with Capt. Mackenzie in the Fort, in which the houses, very few excepted, were empty. The garden in it that was formerly famous is entirely neglected and nothing in it worth attention but a few apple and coffee Trees." Dr. Benjamin Heyne died at Madras in 1819.

== Publications ==
The standard author abbreviation B.Heyne is used to indicate this person as the author when citing a botanical name.

- 1793. "Plants of the Coromandel coast: a collection of watercolor botanical drawings of 394 plants and flora". Not published
- 1800. Joseph Joinville, Thomas John Newbold, James Sowerby, Benjamin Heyne, Mark Wilks, HW Voysey, Theodore Edward Cantor, J. Postaus, John Grant Malcolmson. "List of minerals contained in the Museum of the Honble East India Company". 76 pp.
- 1813 February. "On the formation of sulphur in India", Benjamin Heyne, East India Company, Madras Army, doi:10.1080/14786441308638711, Philosophical Magazine Series 1, Volume 41, Issue 178 pages 101 - 104, Now published as: Philosophical Magazine Series 2
- In 1814, Dr. Heyne authored his major work: "Tracts, historical and statistical, on India: with journals of several tours through various parts of the peninsula: also, an account of Sumatra, in a series of letters", 462 pp., printed for R. Baldwin and Black, Parry and Co.,
- 1819. "On the Deoxidation of the Leaves of Cotyledon calysina": in a Letter to A. B. Lambert. 3 pp. (this was among the earliest evidences for what is now known as Crassulacean acid metabolism)
- 1818. P.J. Siddons, Benjamin Heyne. An examination of so much of the tracts, historical and statistical, on India, & c. & c.& c., by Benjamin Heyne, as Related to the account of Sumatra, with various notices on the subjects of cannibalism, slavery, & c. A. J. Valpy. 99 pp.

Preceded by William Roxburgh	Naturalist to the H.E.I.C. at Madras; 1793-1819	Succeeded by William Somervell Mitchell
