= Srivijayan conquest of Kedah =

7th-century military invasion of the Malay Peninsula

Srivijayan invasion of Malay Peninsula
- Part of the Srivijayan expansion
- Territorial evolution of Srivijaya Empire
Date	c. 682–685 CE
Location	Kedah, Malay Peninsula, and surrounding regions
Result	Srivijayan victory: End of Siamese and Orang Asli influence; Beginning of Malay domination in the Peninsula
Territorial changes	Malay Peninsula were annexed by the Srivijaya

Belligerents
Srivijaya Empire	Old Kedah Kingdom; Nakhon Si Thammarat

Commanders and leaders
Dapunta Hyang Sri Jayanasa	Sri Paduka Maharaja Diraja Putra II (surrendered)

Strength
Thousands of soldiers (estimated); Large fleet of warships Maritime logistical support	Local militias Small naval defenses

The Srivijayan conquest of Kedah, also referred to as the Srivijayan invasion of Kedah was a military campaign launched by Srivijaya to conquer Kedah and capture strategic trading centers in the Strait of Malacca.

== Background ==
Srivijaya was founded in Kota Kapur and became Palembang (the oldest city in Indonesia). However, their position was influenced by Kedah and Melayu. Srivijaya was a centre of Buddhism on Nusantara. Leaders planned to invade Kedah and conquer the Malay Peninsula.

== Conquest ==
In 682 CE, Srivijayan fleets launched raids at Malacca strait. Many Kedahan ships were destroyed or suffered heavy damage. After raiding Kedah fleets, they started to invade Kedah. Srivijayan forces plundered the town of Kedah, capturing many weapons, and destroyed local parties' headquarters in Kedah. The King of Kedah decided to surrender as many of his forces suffered heavy casualties.

== Aftermath ==
Malay polities in Sumatra and Malay Peninsula. By the turn of the 8th century the states in Sumatra and Malay Peninsula were under Srivijayan Malay domination.

Following the conclusion of the conquest, a wave of immigration took place, resulting in the establishment of Malay settlements throughout the peninsula from Sumatra. The enslavement of Negrito tribes commenced as early as 724 CE, during the early contact of the Malay Srivijaya empire. During this period, the Srivijaya king appointed Malay leaders to govern Kedah, replacing the previous rulers. The conquest gained many territories and maintained many strategic ports. Srivijaya positions were strengthened and marked the rise of the Shailendra dynasty, unifying Medang Kingdom and Srivijaya. It also led to the great war against the Javanese kingdom of Mataram.
