= Minto Stone =

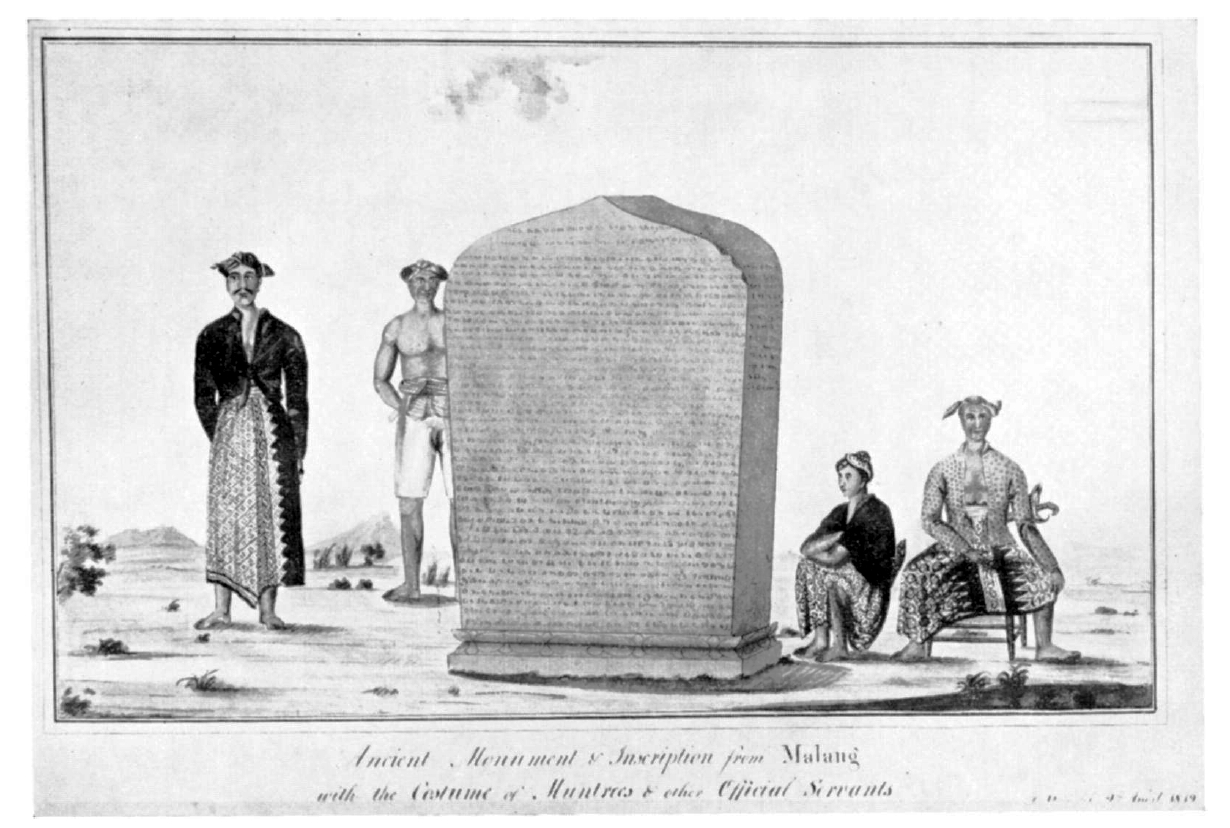
The so-called Minto stone was 2 metres (6.6 ft) high and weighed 3.8 tons. It was found in "Ngendat" and described by Colin Mackenzie in 1811-14

The Minto Stone or Sangguran Inscription, known in Indonesia as Prasasti Sangguran, is a 3 long tons (3.0 t), 2 metres (6.6 ft) tall epigraphy found in Malang, East Java province. In 1812, Sir Thomas Stamford Raffles, then Lieutenant-Governor of the island of Java, removed it along with the so-called "Calcutta Stone" as a token of appreciation to his superior, then British Governor-General of India, Lord Minto. It consequently became part of the Minto family estate near Hawick, Roxburghshire, Scotland.

The inscribed stone is dated to (2 August) 928 CE and mentions the name of a Javanese king, Sri Maharaja Rakai Pangkaja Dyah Wawa Sri Wijayalokanamottungga (Wijayaloka), who then ruled the Malang area. The statement is a grant of rights (sima) to the local ruler and it ends with warnings to anyone wanting to uproot it, cursing that they would meet a horrible death (struck from all sides, beaten, nose cut, head split, liver ripped etc.). According to Indonesian historians, the stone is an important artifact and a crucial source of information. It contains elements about the Mataram kingdom in Central Java and the shift of power that consequently took place to East Java.

Sri Maharaja Rakai Pangkaja Dyah Wawa Sri Wijayalokanamottungga is better known in Indonesia as Dyah Wawa (r. 924—929). He was the last ruler of Mataram. His successor, Mpu Sindok (r. 929—947), moved the court from Central Java to East Java in 929. The reasons for this move are still unclear.

Demands for the repatriation of the stone from Scotland to Java, in Indonesia, have been made since 2004. The stone is on private property; it was last photographed in 2011, at which time the repatriation talks were still ongoing.
