= Criddle =

Criddle is a surname derived from the Old English name Cridela. Notable people with the surname include:

- Deborah Criddle (born 1966), British Paralympic equestrian
- Mary Ann Criddle (1805–1880), English painter
- Murray Criddle (born 1943), Australian politician
- Norman Criddle (1875–1933), English-Canadian entomologist

== See also ==
- Blaney–Criddle equation
- Criddle/Vane Homestead Provincial Park, park in Manitoba, Canada
