= Kahuripan =

11th-century Javanese kingdom

- 1019–1045
- Kehuripan was the predecessor of Janggala and Panjalu (Kadiri)
- Capital: Kahuripan (estuarine of Brantas river somewhere around modern Surabaya and Pasuruan)
- Common languages: Old Javanese, Sanskrit
- Religion: Kejawen, Hinduism, Buddhism
- Government: Monarchy
- Raja
  - 1019–1045: Airlangga
- History
  - Airlangga reunite the former kingdom of Mataram after fell under King Wurawari attack from Lwaram: 1019
  - Airlangga divided his kingdom into Janggala and Panjalu (Kediri): 1045
- Currency: Native gold and silver coins
Preceded by	Succeeded by
Mataram Kingdom	Janggala; Kediri (historical kingdom)

Kahuripan (also spelled Kuripan) was an 11th-century Javanese Hindu-Buddhist kingdom with its capital located around the estuarine of Brantas River valley in East Java. The kingdom was short-lived, only spanning the period between 1019 and 1045, and Airlangga was the only raja of the kingdom, which was built out of the rubble of the Kingdom of Mataram after the Srivijayan invasion. Airlangga later in 1045 abdicated in favour of his two sons and divided the kingdom into Janggala and Panjalu (Kadiri). The kingdom's name derived from Old Javanese term hurip ("to live") with circumfix ka- -an which means "life" or "livelihood". Later in 14th to 15th century, the former kingdom was recognised as one of Majapahit's 12 provinces.

== Fall of Mataram ==
Airlangga was the son of queen Mahendradatta (a princess of the Isyana Dynasty, Mataram, the sister of Dharmawangsa) and Udayana Warmadewa (a king of the Warmadewa Dynasty, Bali). Airlangga was born and grew up in Bali, and spent his youth in Watugaluh Palace, Mataram, under the patronage of his uncle, King Dharmawangsa. Airlangga was betrothed to his cousin, one of Dharmawangsa's daughters, as an arranged marriage. At that time, Mataram had become a powerful kingdom, and was allied to or probably dominated Bali, and had established a colony in West Kalimantan. Dharmawangsa aspired to raise Mataram as a regional power by challenging the Srivijaya Empire's domination. He launched a naval invasion against Srivijaya and unsuccessfully tried to capture Palembang. Srivijaya succeeded in repelling Javanese Mataram invaders.

The Calcutta Stone inscription (dated from 1041), describes a calamity that befell the East Javanese kingdom of the Isyana dynasty in the early years of the 11th century. In 1006, a rebellion incited by a vassal king Wurawari from Lwaram destroyed the capital of Wwatan. The reigning king, Dharmawangsa, successor to Sri Makutawangsawardhana, was murdered along with his entire family and many of his subjects. Only the young Airlangga, who was aged about 16 at the time, managed to escape. According to tradition the calamity, called Pralaya (the death) of Mataram, took place during Airlangga's wedding ceremony in Dharmawangsa palace.

Today historians suggest that the invasion was a Srivijayan retaliation against Mataram for the attacks upon the empire. Wurawari was probably an ally of Srivijaya in Java who managed to sack and burn Wwatan Palace. Airlangga, accompanied by his guard Narottama, escaped into the jungle and retreated as a hermit in Vanagiri (today Wonogiri, Central Java).

== Formation ==
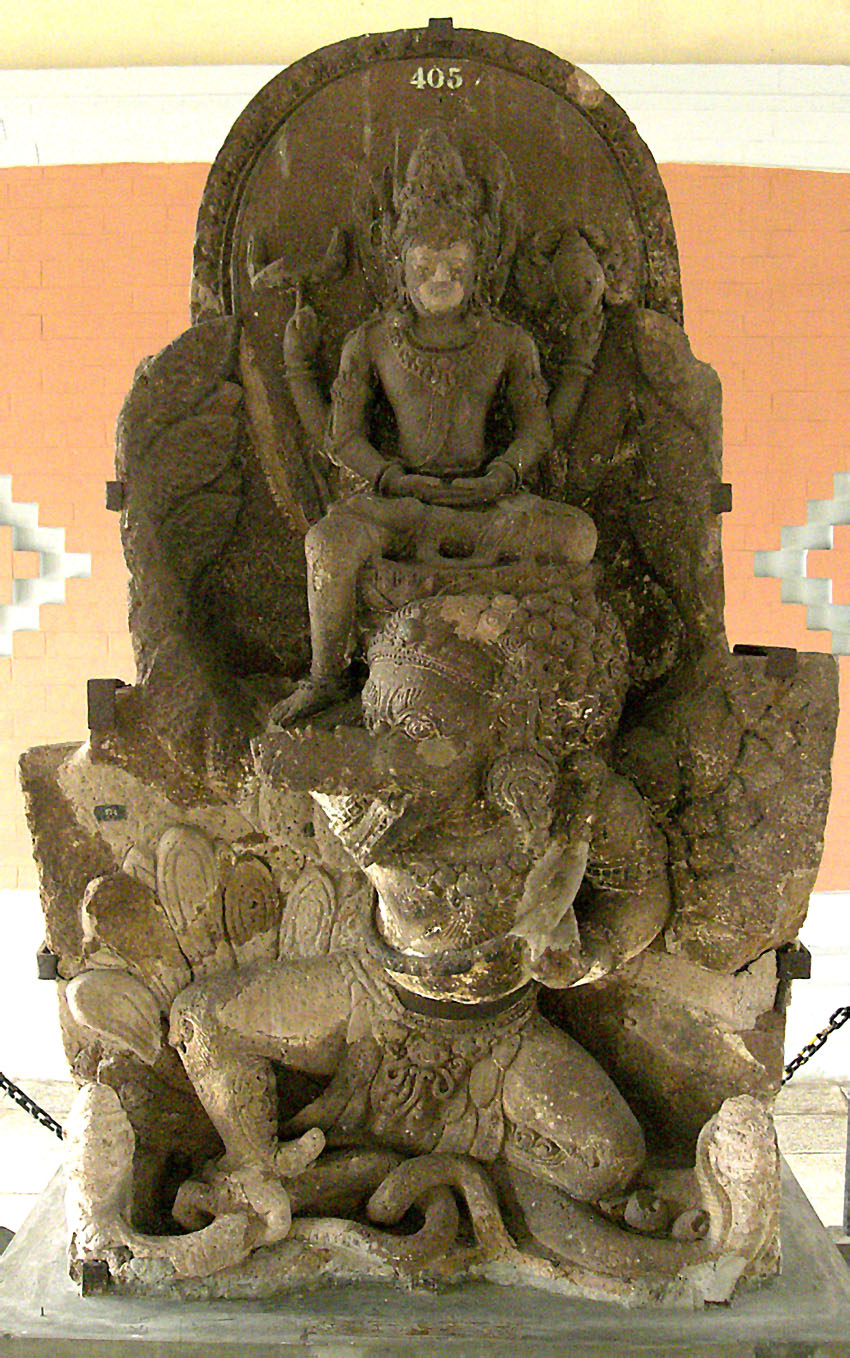
King Airlangga is depicted as Vishnu mounting Garuda, found in Belahan temple.

In 1019, after several years in self-imposed exile in Vanagiri hermitage, Airlangga rallied support from officials and regents that were loyal to the former Isyana dynasty and began to unite the areas that had formerly been ruled by the Mataram kingdom, which had disintegrated after Dharmawangsa's death. He consolidated his authority, established a new kingdom, and made peace with Srivijaya. The new kingdom was called the Kingdom of Kahuripan, and stretched from Pasuruan in the east to Madiun in the west. In 1025, Airlangga increased the power and influence of Kahuripan as the Srivijaya Empire began to decline. Airlangga was known for his religious tolerance and was a patron of both the Hindu and Buddhist religions.

Stone sculptures at Gaprang in Kediri

In 1035 Airlangga constructed a Buddhist monastery named Srivijayasrama dedicated to his queen consort Dharmaprasadottungadevi. The monastery bearing the name of Srivijaya suggests that his queen consort was probably a Srivijayan princess, a close relative, daughter, of the Srivijayan king Sangramavijayattungavarman. She had taken refuge in East Java after her father was taken prisoner and her kingdom was raided through a series of raids by the Indian Emperors Rajendra Chola I and Virarajendra Chola of the Chola dynasty. The decline of Srivijaya due to the Chola invasion allowed Airlangga to consolidate his kingdom without foreign interference. Later, he extended his kingdom to Central Java and Bali. The north coast of Java, particularly the port of Hujung Galuh (modern Surabaya) and Kambang Putih (modern Tuban), for the first time, became important centres of trade.

Although there are few surviving archaeological remains dating from his time, Airlangga is known to have been a patron of the arts, notably literature. In 1035, the court poet Mpu Kanwa composed the Arjuna Wiwaha text, which was adapted from the Mahabharata epic. This text told the story of Arjuna, an incarnation of Indra, but was also an allegory for Airlangga's own life. The tale of Airlangga's life was illustrated in the Belahan Temple on the flanks of Mount Penanggungan, where he was portrayed in stone as Vishnu on Garuda.

In 1037 the capital was moved from Watan Mas to Kahuripan, the king also reported to bestow titles for his loyal followers, such as Narottama promoted as Rakryan Kanuruhan (prime minister) and Niti as Rakryan Kuningan. According to the Kelagen inscription (dated 1037), Airlangga also took an interest in agriculture development. He embarked on a irrigation project by constructing the Wringin Sapta dam (located in today's Jombang Regency). By building a dam on the Brantas River, he provided irrigation to surrounding paddy fields and maintained the hydraulic system in the area.

== Partition ==
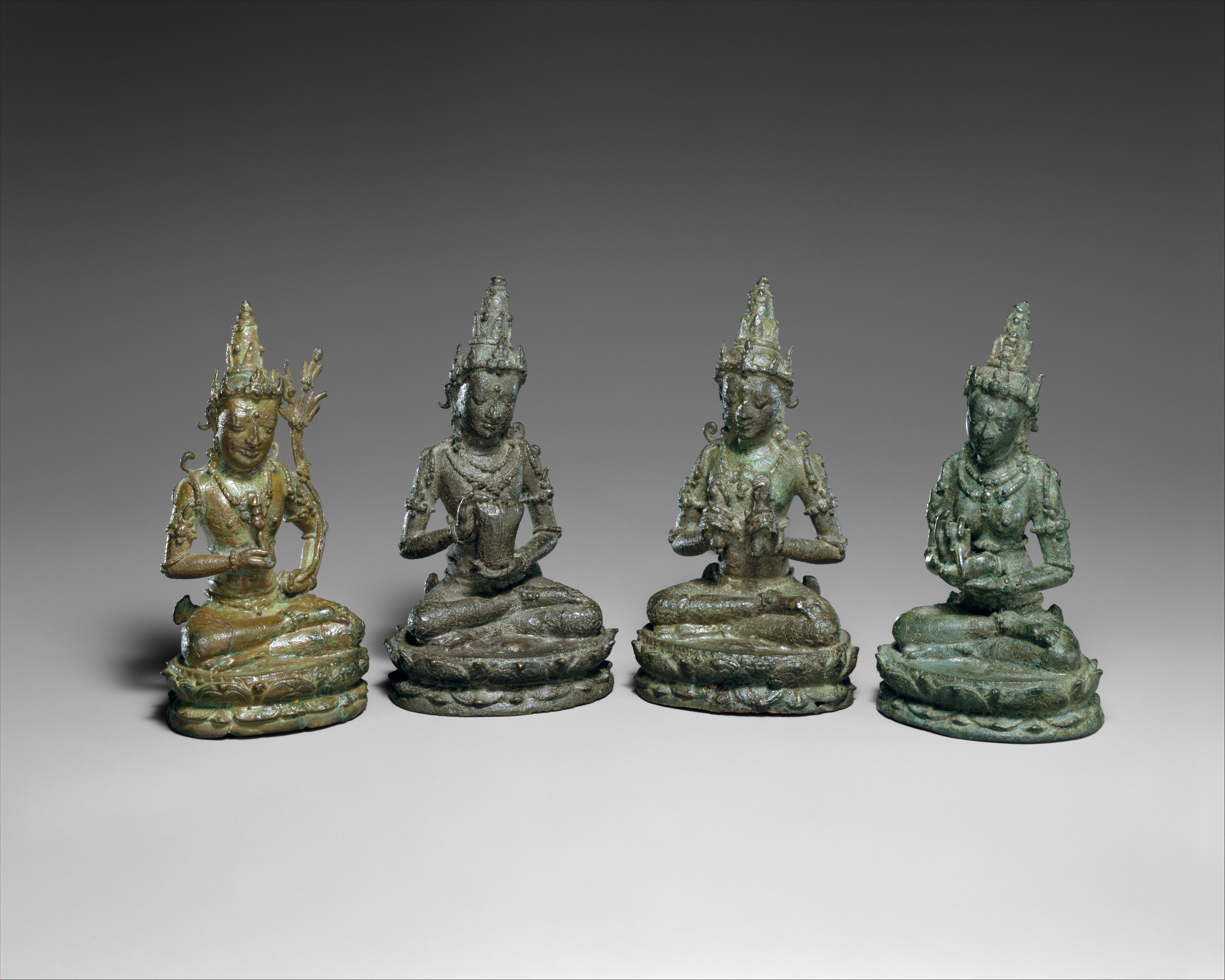
Nganjuk bronze figures depicting Boddhisattvas, late 10th to mid 11th century originated from the Kahuripan kingdom period in East Java.

Towards the end of his life, Airlangga was faced with the problem of succession. His heiress, the crown princess Sanggramawijaya, chose to become a Bhikkuni Buddhist hermit rather than succeed Airlangga. Sangramawijaya was the daughter of the queen consort. The story of a crown princess who renounces the throne to become a hermit is linked with the popular legend of Dewi Kilisuci who resides in the Selomangleng Cave beneath Mount Klothok, 5 kilometers to the west of the city of Kediri. In 1045, Airlangga divided Kahuripan into two kingdoms which were inherited by his two sons; Janggala and Kediri. Airlangga himself abdicated the throne in 1045 and returned to the hermit life by assuming a new name Resi Gentayu, bestowed by Mpu Bharada, a famous hermit. A local legend, mixed with fantastic fiction, mentions the partition of the kingdom. It was said that Mpu Bharada was the one who conducted the partition; with his extraordinary skill, he flew and poured water from a jar that the water traces magically transformed into a river marking the boundary of the two new kingdoms. He became accidentally stuck on a kamal (tamarind) tree, and he cursed the kamal tree to be forever short, leading to the name of the village where this event took place; kamal pandak ("the short tamarind tree").

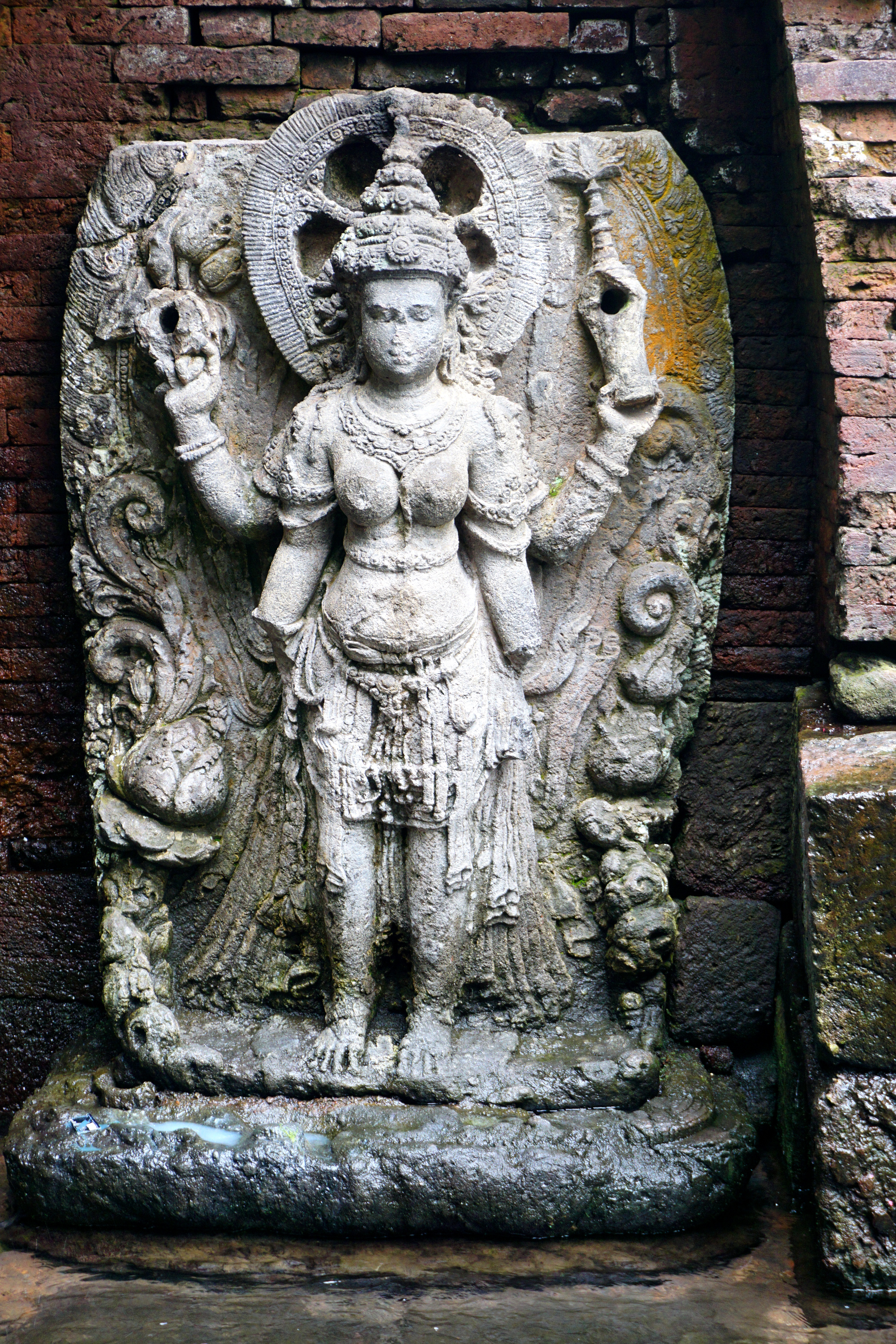
Statue of Lakshmi, Belahan temple, Mount Penanggungan.

Airlanga died in 1049, and his ashes were buried in Belahan tirtha (sacred bathing pool), on the eastern slopes of Mount Penanggungan; in one of the waterspout statues he was portrayed as Vishnu riding Garuda, flanked by statues of two goddesses; Shri and Lakshmi portrayed the two queen consorts of Airlangga.

After the death of Airlangga, a civil war broke out between Janggala and Panjalu that continued until 1052. In that year, King Mapanji Alanjung Ahyes of Panjalu succeeded in conquering Janggala. However, in 1059, another king named Samarotsaha ascended the throne of Janggala; he was the son-in-law of Airlangga.

== Kahuripan during Majapahit period ==
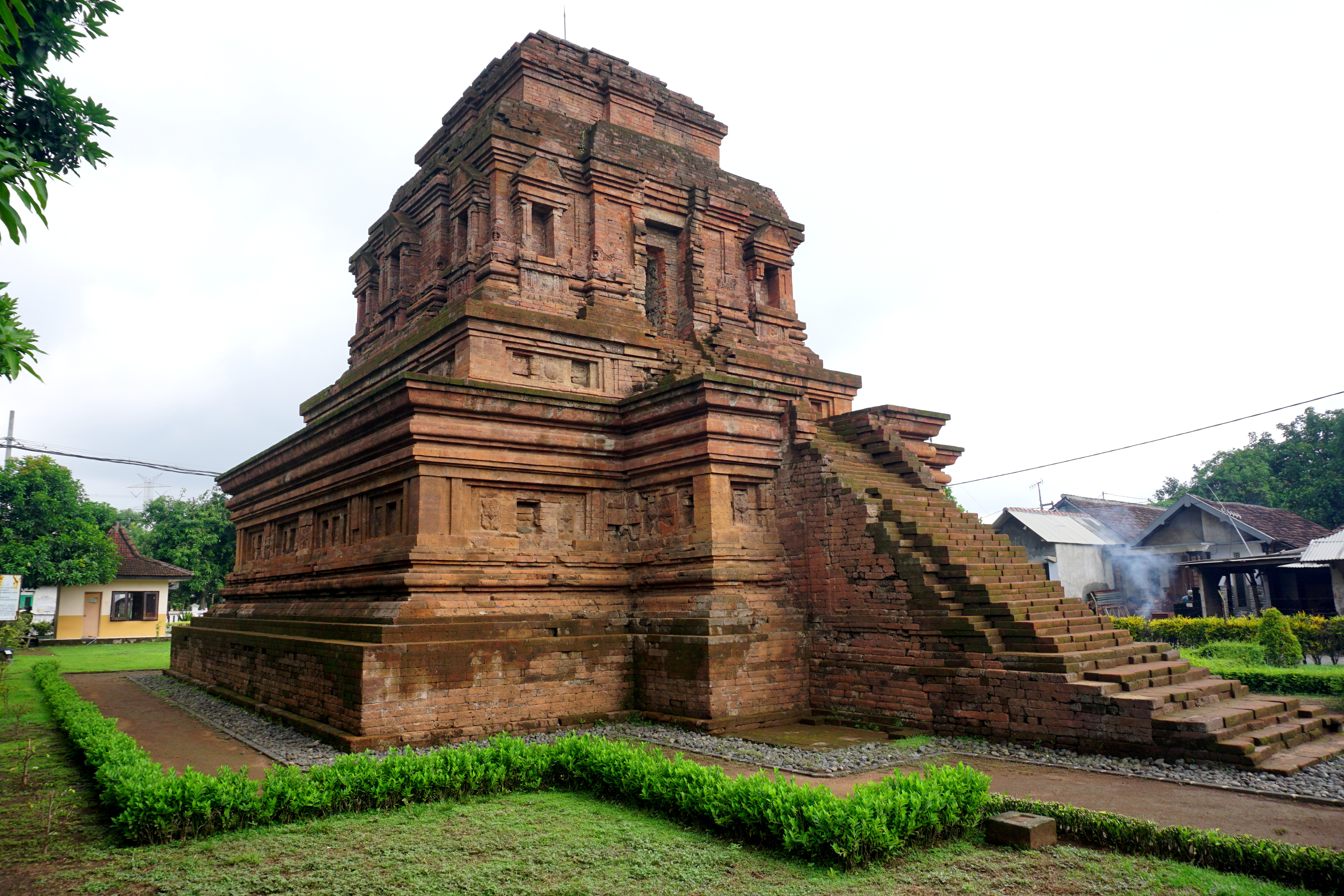
Gunung Gangsir temple, possibly built during Kahuripan kingdom and renovated in later Majapahit period.

The name of the Kahuripan kingdom reappears during the Majapahit period c. 14th to 15th century. It was held as one of Majapahit's 12 provinces and recognised as one of the most important Majapahit territories together with Daha (Kadiri). Both areas flanking Trowulan, the Majapahit capital; Daha in the west and Kahuripan in the east. Kahuripan region was important for Majapahit because this area around the estuarine of Brantas River is the coastal region where Hujung Galuh town, one of the main Majapahit ports, was located.

Pararaton recorded several Majapahit state officials as the regent of Kahuripan, titled Bhatara i Kahuripan or Bhre Kahuripan. The first is Tribhuwana Wijayatunggadewi the daughter of Raden Wijaya. After 1319, she was assisted by Gajah Mada promoted as patih (prime minister) of Kahuripan, as the reward for his service in cracking down Ra Kuti rebellion.

Hayam Wuruk, during his early years as Yuvaraja (crown prince), also held the title of the king of Kahuripan Jiwanarajyapratistha. After he ascended to the Majapahit throne, the title of Bhre Kahuripan was returned to his mother Tribhuwana Tunggadewi.

After the death of Tribhuwana Tunggadewi, the title of Kahuripan regent was held by her granddaughter Surawardhani, later inherited by her son Ratnapangkaja. After Ratnapangkaja the title was held by Queen Suhita's nephew, Rajasawardhana. When Rajasawardhana ascended the throne of Majapahit, the title of Bhre Kahuripan was inherited by his son Samarawijaya.
