= Mpu Sindok =

King of Mataram
- Reign: 929 – 947
- Predecessor: Rakai Pangkaja Dyah Wawa
- Successor: Ishana Tunggawijaya
- Born: Dyah Siṇḍok
- Spouse: Rakryan Parameswari Dyah Wardhani Mpu Kbi
- Issue: Ishana Tunggawijaya
Regnal name
- Śrī Mahārāja Rakai Halu Dyaḥ Siṇḍok Śrī Īśānawikrama Dharmottuṅgadewawijaya (Gulunggulung inscription) Rakryan Sri Maharaja Mpu Sindok Sang Sri Ishanotunggawijaya (Geweg inscription)
- House: Ishana

Śrī Mahārāja Rake Halu Dyaḥ Siṇḍok Śrī Īśānawikrama Dharmottuṅgadewawijaya (also known as Dyah Sindok, Mpu Sindok or Sindok) was the last king of the Sanjaya dynasty who ruled the Kingdom of Mataram from Central Java, reigned from around 928 or 929 AD. Sindok moved the seat of power of the Mataram kingdom from Central Java to East Java in 929 AD, probably as a result of the eruption of Mount Merapi and/or invasion from Srivijaya.

The new capital of the kingdom was Watugaluh, on the banks of the Brantas River, near the present day Jombang Regency. Sindok was also the founder of the Ishana dynasty, and thus the new kingdom is also sometimes referred to as "Ishana". An inscription currently at the Indian Museum in Kolkata, describes Sindok's descendants down to Airlangga, in the 11th century AD.

Sindok had two wives, one of whom, Sri Parameswari Dyah Kbi, was probably the daughter of Dyah Wawa, the preceding king of Mataram in Central Java. Thus, Sindok succeeded to the throne of Mataram because of his marriage.

During his reign, the Kakawin Ramayana and the Sanghyang Kamahayanikan were written. Sindok was succeeded by his daughter, Sri Isanatungawijaya.

== See also ==
- Mataram kingdom
- Ishana dynasty

Preceded by Wawa	Monarch of Mataram; 929–947	Succeeded by Isyana Tunggawijaya
