= Calcutta Stone =

Ancient Javanese inscription

The Calcutta Stone, known in Indonesia as the Pucangan Inscription, is an ancient Javanese inscription written in Sanskrit and Old Javanese, dated to 1041 CE during the reign of king Airlangga of the Kahuripan kingdom, which explains some events and the royal genealogy of the king. The inscription more or less narrates the life story of King Airlangga, one of the greatest kings in Javanese history, also explaining his lineage as the rightful ruler of Java, the successor of King Dharmawangsa of Isyana dynasty. This inscription was known as the "Calcutta Stone" because it has been stored at the Indian Museum in Kolkata (Calcutta), India, from the 19th century until today.

The Pucangan inscription is a bilingual inscription carved on both sides of a single monolith. The front side is written in Old Javanese while the other side is written in Sanskrit. Both inscriptions are written in the Kawi script (Ancient Javanese script). The inscription scape is a block with pointed top, on the base of the inscription is adorned with padma (lotus) pedestal. The name Pucangan derived from a word in this inscription. It was the name of a place on the slopes of Mount Penanggungan, today located in Mojokerto Regency, East Java.

== Content ==
The inscription describes a terrible pralaya (calamity) that befell the East Javanese Mataram kingdom of Isyana Dynasty in the early years of the 11th century. In 1016, a rebellion incited by a vassal king Wurawari from Lwaram resulted in the destruction of the capital of Watugaluh. The reigning king, Dharmawangsa, successor to Sri Makutawangsawardhana, was murdered along with his entire family and many of his subjects. Only the young Airlangga, who was aged about 16 at the time, managed to escape unharmed.

== Discovery ==
The Pucangan inscription was discovered on the slope of Mount Penanggungan in East Java and sent to Sir Thomas Stamford Raffles, the British Governor General of Java 1813–1816 in Batavia. In 1812 Raffles sent it together with Sangguran inscription to Lord Minto, Governor-General of India in Calcutta, as a token of appreciation. This inscription was stored in Calcutta Museum while the Sangguran inscription was taken by Lord Minto back to his estate in Hawick, Roxburghshire, Scotland.

== Inscription ==
Quotation of some verses in the inscription.

=== Transcription ===
1. // svasti // tribhira piguna airu petonŗņa āvvidhānesthi tautathā pralaye aguņaiti yaħ prasiddhasta smaidhāthre namas satatam
2. agaņi vikrama guruņā praņam yamānas surādhipe nasadã piyas trivikrama iti prathito loke namasta smai

=== Translation ===
1. Congratulation and well-being! respect and great honor for him, always blessed with three guna when the destiny of human (mortals) are already predestinated, so when the destruction (strike or happen) it is meant to be, so be it for the Creator had not the guna.
2. Honor for him, that is (performing) triwikrama, known in the world as (three) great steps without any predisposition, also always honoring the mind (decision) of the King of Gods
