= Chola invasion of Srivijaya =

1025–1026 Chola military campaign

- Part of Southeast Asian campaign of Rajendra I
- Rajendra Chola's territories c. 1030 AD
Date	1025–1026 AD
Location	Palembang (Sumatra) and Kedah (Malay Peninsula), Srivijaya
Result	Chola victory; Chola influence in Srivijaya; Sangrama Vijayatunggavarman is captured; Dissolution of Srivijayan mandala

Belligerents
Chola Empire	Srivijaya Empire

Commanders and leaders
Rajendra I Beemaseenan; Amarabujangan Divakara; Karunaakaran	Sangrama I (POW); Samara Vijayatunggavarman

Units involved
Chola Navy; Chola Army	Srivijaya Navy; Srivijaya Army

In 1025 AD, the Chola Emperor Rajendra I launched naval invasions on Srivijaya in Maritime Southeast Asia, leading to the fall of the Sailendra dynasty of Srivijaya.

Rajendra's overseas expedition against Srivijaya was a unique event in India's history and its otherwise peaceful relations with the states of Southeast Asia. Several places in present-day Indonesia and the Malay Peninsula were invaded by Rajendra I of the Chola dynasty. The invasion furthered the expansion of Tamil merchant associations such as the Manigramam, Ayyavole and Ainnurruvar into Southeast Asia.

The Chola invasion also coincided with return voyage of the great Bengali Buddhist scholar Atiśa (c. 982–1054) from Sumatra to India and Tibet in 1025.

== Background ==
Throughout much of their history, ancient India and Indonesia maintained peaceful and friendly relations, making the Chola invasion a unique event in Asian history.

In the 9th and 10th centuries, Srivijaya had close ties with the Pala Empire in Bengal. An 860 Nalanda inscription records that Maharaja Balaputra of Srivijaya dedicated a monastery at the Nalanda mahavihara in Pala territory. Relations between Srivijaya and the Chola dynasty of southern India were cordial during the reign of Rajaraja I. In 1006, King Maravijayattungavarman, a Srivijayan Maharaja from the Sailendra dynasty, constructed the Chudamani Vihara in the port town of Nagapattinam. However, during the reign of Rajendra I, relations deteriorated as the Cholas attacked Srivijayan cities.

Srivijaya controlled two major naval choke points, the Malacca Strait and the Sunda Strait, and was a significant trading empire with formidable naval forces. The northwest opening of the Malacca Strait was controlled from Kedah on the Malay Peninsula and from Pannai on the Sumatran side, while Malayu (in Jambi) and Palembang controlled the southeast opening and the Sunda Strait. Srivijaya enforced a naval trade monopoly, compelling ships passing through their waters to stop at their ports or risk being plundered.

The Cholas benefitted from both agriculture and foreign trade. Their seafaring activities sometimes led to overseas trade and conquest, including in Southeast Asia.

The reasons for the Chola naval expedition are unclear. Historian Nilakanta Sastri suggested that the conflict may have arisen from Srivijayan attempts to obstruct Chola trade with the East, especially China, or perhaps from Rajendra's desire to extend his digvijaya (world conquest) across the sea, adding prestige to his reign. Another theory posits that geopolitical and diplomatic factors motivated the invasion. King Suryavarman I of the Khmer Empire sought assistance from Rajendra Chola I against the Tambralinga kingdom. In response, the Tambralinga kingdom sought aid from Srivijayan king Sangrama Vijayatunggavarman.

== Invasion ==
The Chola invasion of Srivijaya was a swift campaign that left Srivijaya unprepared. In the 11th century, the Chola navy had become a formidable force, while Srivijaya's sea power had weakened. Indian ships typically sailed eastward across the Bay of Bengal, stopping at ports in Lamuri, Aceh, or Kedah in the Malay Peninsula before entering the Malacca Strait. However, the Chola fleet sailed directly to the west coast of Sumatra. The port of Barus on North Sumatra’s west coast, controlled by Tamil trade guilds, served as a resupply point after crossing the Indian Ocean. From there, the Chola fleet sailed southward along Sumatra's west coast and entered the Sunda Strait.

The Srivijaya navy, stationed at Kedah near the northwest opening of the Malacca Strait, was unaware of the Chola invasion approaching from the south via the Sunda Strait. The first Srivijayan city to be attacked was Palembang, the empire's capital. The sudden assault allowed the Cholas to sack the city, plundering the Kadatuan royal palace and monasteries. The Thanjavur inscription records that Rajendra Chola captured King Sangrama Vijayottunggavarman of Srivijaya and seized treasures, including the Vidhyadara Torana, a jeweled 'war gate' of Srivijaya.

Despite their success, the Cholas did not establish lasting control over the captured cities, as the campaign primarily involved fast-moving raids and plunder. The Chola fleet likely utilized the Southeast Asian monsoon winds to swiftly move between ports. This tactic of rapid, unexpected attacks contributed to the Cholas' success, as it prevented the Srivijayan mandala from organizing defenses, mounting a response, or seeking aid. The war ended in a Chola victory, significantly weakening Srivijaya and breaking its maritime monopoly in the region.

== Aftermath ==
Charter issued by Rajendra I that declared the collection of revenue to build a Buddhist Vihara in Srivijaya.

With the Maharaja Sangrama Vijayottunggavarman imprisoned and most of its cities destroyed, the leaderless Srivijaya mandala entered a period of chaos and confusion, marking the end of the Sailendra dynasty. According to the 15th-century Malay Annals, Rajendra Chola I, after the successful naval raid in 1025 married Onang Kiu, the daughter of Sangrama Vijayottunggavarman.

The invasion forced Srivijaya to make peace with Javanese kingdom of Kahuripan. The peace deal was brokered by the exiled daughter of Sangrama Vijayottunggavarman, a Srivijayan princess who managed to escape the destruction of Palembang and came to the court of King Airlangga in East Java. She also became the queen consort of Airlangga named Dharmaprasadottungadevi and in 1035, Airlangga constructed a Buddhist monastery named Srivijayasrama dedicated to his queen consort.

This invasion gravely weakened the Srivijayan hegemony and enabled the formation of regional kingdoms like Kahuripan and its successor, Kediri in Java based on agriculture rather than coastal and long-distance trade. Sri Deva was enthroned as the new king and the trading activities resumed. He sent an embassy to the court of China in 1028 CE. Sanfoqi sent a mission to China in 1028, but this would refer to Malayu-Jambi, not Srivijaya-Palembang. No Srivijayan envoys came to China between 1028–1077, indicating that the mandala of Srivijaya had faded. It is very possible that Srivijaya collapsed in 1025. In the following centuries, Chinese chronicles still refer to "Sanfoqi", but this term probably refers to the Malayu-Jambi kingdom, evidenced by Chinese record of Sanfoqi Zhanbei guo (Jambi country of Sanfoqi). The last epigraphic evidence that mentions the word "Sriwijaya" or "Srivijaya" comes from the Tanjore inscription of the Chola kingdom in 1030 or 1031.

The Chola control over Srivijaya lasted for several decades. Chinese chronicles mentioned Sanfoqi Zhu-nian guo which means "Chola country of Sanfoqi", likely referring to Kedah. Sanfoqi Zhu-nian guo sent missions to China in 1077, 1079, 1082, 1088, and 1090. It is possible that the Cholas installed a crown prince in the Tamil-dominated area of the Malacca Straits.

Tamil colonization of the Malacca Straits seems to have lasted for a century. The Cholas left several inscriptions in northern Sumatra and the Malay peninsula. Tamil influence can be found in works of art (sculpture and temple architecture), it indicated government activity rather than commerce. Chola's grip on the northern Sumatra and the Malay peninsula receded in the 12th century — the Tamil poem Kalingatupparani of around 1120 mentioned Kulottungga's destruction of Kadaram (Kedah). After that, Kedah disappeared from Indian sources.

== See also ==
- Greater India
- Indosphere
- Sanskritisation
- Maritime history of Odisha
- Indian cultural influences in early Philippine polities
- Hinduism in Indonesia
- Hinduism in Malaysia
- Hinduism in Philippines
