= Southeast Asian campaign of Rajendra I =

1025–1068 Chola military campaign

Rajendra Chola I's Southeast Asian campaign
- Map of the Chola empire after Rajendra I's South-east Asian campaign.
Date	1025–1068
Location	Southern Thailand, Myanmar, Malaysia, Philippines, and Indonesia
Result	Chola victory; Much of Malay Peninsula sacked and conquered by the Cholas; Expansion of Indian influence and culture into Southeast Asia; Dissolution of Srivijayan mandala; Conquest of Pegu (Burma); Later campaigns in the Philippines by other Cholas; Establishment of Rajahanate of Cebu

Belligerents
Chola Empire; Khmer Empire	Srivijaya; Kadaram; Kingdom of Pegu; Pennai; Malayiur; Mayirudingam; Tambralinga: Langkasuka; Mappapalam; Talaittakkolam; Nakkavadam

Commanders and leaders
Rajendra I Suryavarman I	Sangrama Wijaya (POW); Samara Vijayatunggavarman

Strength
Unknown	Unknown

Casualties and losses
Unknown	Heavy

Inscriptions and historical sources describe the medieval Chola Emperor Rajendra I sending a naval expedition to Indochina, the Indonesia, and Malay Peninsula in 1025 in order to subdue Srivijaya. The Thiruvalangadu plates, the Leyden grant, and the Tamil stele of Rajendra I are the principal sources of information about the campaign.

== Sources ==
The most detailed source of information on the campaign is the Tamil stele of Rajendra I. The stele states:

(Who) having despatched many ships in the midst of the rolling sea and having caught Sangrāma-vijayōttunga-varman, the king of Kadāram, together with the elephants in his glorious army, (took) the large heap of treasures, which (that king) had rightfully accumulated; (captured) with noise the (arch called) Vidhyādharatorana at the "war gate" of his extensive city, Śrī Vijaya with the "jewelled wicket-gate" adorned with great splendour and the "gate of large jewels"; Paṇṇai with water in its bathing ghats; the ancient Malaiyūr with the strong mountain for its rampart; Māyuriḍingam, surrounded by the deep sea (as) by a moat; Ilangāśōka (i.e. Lankāśōka) undaunted in fierce battles; Māpappālam having abundant (deep) water as defence; Mēviḷimbangam having fine walls as defence; Vaḷaippandūru having Viḷappandūru (?); Talaittakkōlam praised by great men (versed in) the sciences; Mādamālingam, firm in great and fierce battles; Ilāmuridēśam, whose fierce strength rose in war; Mānakkavāram, in whose extensive flower gardens honey was collecting; and Kadāram, of fierce strength, which was protected by the deep sea

The Thiruvalangadu plates, from the fourteenth year of Rajendra Chola I, mentions his conquest of Kadaram but does not go into the details. The first attempt by someone from outside India to identify the places associated with the campaign was made by epigraphist E. Hultzsch, who had published the stele in 1891. Hultzsch identified the principalities mentioned in the inscription with places ruled by the Pandyan Dynasty. In 1903, he rescinded his theory and stated that the stele described Rajendra Chola I's conquest of Bago in Burma. George Coedès' Le Royaume de Sri Vijaya published in 1918 after several years of research, rejected both the theories and provided the first convincing description of Rajendra Chola I's conquest of Southeast Asia.

== Causes ==
A careful examination of Chinese records demonstrates that relations between the Chola kingdom and Srivijaya prior to 1025 were less amicable than Nilakanta Sastri has asserted. Chinese sources indicate that Srivijayan representatives may have conveyed inaccurate information regarding the Chola kingdom to the Song court before 1015, the year in which the first diplomatic mission from the southern Indian kingdom reached China. This is evident both from the status accorded to the Cholas by the Song court and from a memorial submitted to Emperor Huizong in 1106. When Huizong directed that envoys from Pagan (in present-day Myanmar) be received with the same status as that granted to Chola embassies, the president of the Council of Rites raised an objection, stating:

The Chola [kingdom] is subject to Srivijaya, this is why during the Xining reign period (1068–1077), we wrote to its ruler on coarse paper with an envelope of plain stuff. Pagan, on the other hand, is a great kingdom and should not be perceived as a small tributary state. [It] deserves a comparable status [given to] the Arabs, Jiaozhi (present-day Vietnam), and other similar states.

The inaccurate claim of a Srivijayan subjugation of the Cholas, as recorded in the memorial, appears to have been conveyed to the Song court prior to the arrival of the first Chola embassy. Upon reaching the Song court, the Cholas were granted a status comparable to that of Kucha, a Central Asian tributary of the Song. The ranking of a foreign kingdom was customarily determined by its perceived military strength, which in turn dictated the ceremonial reception accorded to its envoys. Commercially, the assignment of a higher status conferred preferential trading privileges upon merchants associated with that kingdom at Song ports. By designating the Chola kingdom as a tributary state, the Song court not only regarded the Cholas as militarily subordinate to Srivijaya but also implied that traders from southern India were likely to enjoy more restricted access to Chinese markets and trading rights than their Southeast Asian counterparts.

It is possible that Srivijayan traders and officials deliberately misinformed the Chinese about the military strength of the Cholas. Chinese sources even incorrectly list Sri Lanka ; parts of which the Cholas occupied in the eleventh century as a dependency of Srivijaya. The Srivijayans appear to have been the main source of information on southern Asia for Song scribes. This would explain why Chinese accounts make no mention of the Chola raids on Srivijayan ports, and why Song officials continued to insist, at least until the early twelfth century, that the Chola kingdom was a vassal of Srivijaya.

The relation between Srivijaya and the Chola dynasty of Tamilakam was initially friendly during the reign of Rajaraja I. In 1006, a Srivijayan Maharaja from Sailendra dynasty, king Maravijayattungavarman, constructed the Chudamani Vihara in the port town of Nagapattinam. However, during the reign of Rajendra I the relations deteriorate as the Chola Dynasty started to attack Srivijayan cities.

The causes of the hostility are obscure. While some scholars opine that the campaign was undertaken to establish Chola dominance over the seas of South-East Asia, other suggest that it might have been a war of plunder. It seems that the Khmer king Suryavarman I of the Khmer Empire requested aid from the powerful Chola Emperor Rajendra against the Tambralinga kingdom. After learning of Suryavarman's alliance with Rajendra Chola, the Tambralinga kingdom requested aid from the Srivijaya king Sangrama Vijayatungavarman. This eventually led to the Chola Empire coming into conflict with the Srivijiya Empire. The war ended with a victory for the Chola dynasty and Angkor Wat of the Khmer Empire, and major losses for the Srivijaya Empire and the Tambralinga kingdom.

The interactions among Song China, the Cholas, and the Srivijayans further illustrate that maritime exchanges were not invariably peaceful. Subsequently, the Yuan and Ming dynasties of China sought to employ their naval strength to shape the character of commercial and diplomatic relations in the Indian Ocean. Nevertheless, the Chola attacks against Srivijaya stand out as distinctive owing to the commercial incentives that prompted these attacks. Prior to this period, exchanges between southern Asia and China had been primarily characterized by the dissemination of Buddhist thought. The triangular dynamic involving Song China, the Cholas, and the Srivijayans underscores the elevated significance of commerce in Indo-Chinese relations and in broader cross-cultural interactions across Asia.

== Conquests ==
Sri Vijaya

The stele of Rajendra Chola I mentions Sri Vijaya as the first of the countries conquered. The Tamil inscription lists Sri Vijaya with "its jewelled wicket-gate" and "a gate of large jewels" as the first of the treasures captured by the fleet. The Sri Vijaya, mentioned in the inscriptions, has been identified by Coedès with the Sri Vijaya kingdom which rule from its base at Palembang in South Sumatra.

Pannai

Pannai, with its bathing ghats, is second of the lands to be conquered by the naval fleet. Pannai has been identified as Panai or Pane, a city on the eastern coast of North Sumatra, located on the estuary of Panai River and Barumun River.

Malaiyur

Malaiyur, with "its strong mountain", has been identified with Malayu in today's Jambi province in Batanghari river valley, where a strong principality flourished at that time. Other suggestion is the southern part of the Malay Peninsula

Mayirudingam

Mayirudingam is believed to be the same as Ji-lo-ting listed by the Chinese writer Chau Ju-Kua among the dependencies of Sri Vijaya and is identified with the city of Chaiya in the centre of the Malay Peninsula. Some placed it at the Sathing Phra Peninsular in Songkhla, where the Chinese called Rìluótíng in the 13th–14th century.

Ilangasoka

The land of Ilangasoka (Langkasuka) mentioned in the inscriptions has been located on the east coast of the Malay Peninsula and is believed to be the same as the province of Ling-ya-sseu-kia mentioned in Chau Ju-Kua's list.

Mapappalam

The epigraphist V. Venkayya identifies Mapappalam of the inscription with the city of Papphalama mentioned in the Mahavamsa. The place is believed to be located in the Talaing region of Lower Burma.

Mevilimbangam

Mevilimbangam is identified with Kamalanka or Lang-ya-hsiu, centered at the ancient Nakhon Pathom on the north shore of the present-day Gulf of Siam.

Talaittakkolam

Talaittakkolam is believed to be the same as Takkola mentioned by Ptolemy as a trading emporion on the Golden Chersonese, and identified with Trang or the modern-day city of Takuapa in the Isthmus of Kra.

Nakkavaram

Nakkavaram, mentioned in the records, has been identified by V. Venkayya with the Nicobar Islands.

Kadaram

The place Kadaram (modern Kedah) mentioned in the stele is identified with the Kataha of Sanskrit literature and Kadaram of the Kalingattuparani and the Kiet-cha of the Chinese chronicles.

== Results ==
The Southeast Asia campaign intensified interactions between India and Southeast Asia. The campaign also led to the establishment of diplomatic ties with China. The first Tamil embassy to the court of the Song Emperor was sent by Rajaraja I in 1015. This was followed by a second embassy by his son, Rajendra I, in 1033 and a third by Kulottunga I in 1077. The Chola Empire did not establish its direct rule over South-East Asia though they might have levied a periodic tribute.

Traders from the Tamil country firmly established themselves over various parts of South-East Asia. A merchant guild was set up in Burma and another in Sumatra in 1088.

Rajamuda Lumaya, a half-Malay and half-Tamil from Sumatra. founded the Rajahnate of Cebu in the Philippines, the capital of Cebu was locally rendered as Singhapala (ᜐᜒᜅ᜔ᜑᜉᜎ) the Tamil-Sanskrit root being for "Lion City", the same root words with the modern city-state of Singapore (சிங்கப்பூர்).

Indian historian V. R. Ramachandra Dikshitar suggests that Tamil traders of the Chola period might have had a knowledge of Australia and Polynesia.

== Bibliography ==
- Kulke, Hermann; Kesavapany, K.; Sakhuja, Vijay (2009). Nagapattinam to Suvarnadwipa: Reflections on Chola naval expeditions to Southeast Asia. Institute of Southeast Asian Studies. ISBN 978-9812309365.
- Sastri, K. A. Nilakanta (2000) [1935]. The Cōlas. Madras: University of Madras.
