= History of Indian influence on Southeast Asia =

Historic Indosphere cultural influence zone of Greater India for transmission of elements of Indian elements such as the honorific titles, naming of people, naming of places, linguistic borrowings, mottos of organisations and educational institutes as well as adoption of Hinduism, Buddhism, Indian architecture, martial arts, Indian music and dance, traditional Indian clothing, and Indian cuisine, a process which has been also aided by the ongoing historic expansion of Indian diaspora.

Southeast Asia was in the Indian sphere of cultural influence from 290 BCE to the 15th century CE, when Hindu-Buddhist influences were incorporated into local political systems. Kingdoms in the southeast coast of the Indian subcontinent had established trade, cultural and political relations with Southeast Asian kingdoms in Burma, Bhutan, Thailand, the Sunda Islands, Malay Peninsula, Philippines, Cambodia, Laos, and Champa. This led to the Indianisation and Sanskritisation of Southeast Asia within the Indosphere, Southeast Asian polities were the Indianised Hindu-Buddhist Mandala (polities, city states and confederacies).

Indian culture itself arose from various distinct cultures and peoples, also including Austroasiatic linguistic influence onto early Indians. However some scholars, such as Professor Przyluski, Jules Bloch, and Lévi, concluded that not only linguistic but there are also some cultural, and even political Austroasiatic influence on early Indian culture and traditions. India is seen as a melting pot of western, eastern and indigenous traditions. This distinctly Indian cultural system was later adopted and assimilated into the indigenous social construct and statehood of Southeast Asian regional polity, which rulers gained power and stability, transforming small chieftains into regional powers.

Unlike the other kingdoms which existed on the Indian subcontinent, the Pallava Empire which ruled the southeastern coast of the Indian peninsula did not impose cultural restrictions on people who wished to cross the sea. The Chola Empire, which executed the South-East Asian campaign of Rajendra Chola I and the Chola invasion of Srivijaya, profoundly impacted Southeast Asia. This impact led to more exchanges with Southeast Asia on the sea routes. Whereas Buddhism thrived and became the main religion in many countries of Southeast Asia, it became a minority religion in India.

The peoples of maritime Southeast Asia — present-day Malaysia, Indonesia and the Philippines — are thought to have migrated southward from South China sometime between 2500 and 1500 BC. The influence of the civilization which existed on the Indian subcontinent gradually became predominant among them, and it also became predominant among the peoples which lived on the Southeast Asian mainland.

Southern Indian traders, adventurers, teachers and priests continued to be the dominating influences in Southeast Asia until about 1500 CE. Hinduism and Buddhism both spread to these states from India and for many centuries, they existed there with mutual toleration. Eventually the states of the mainland mainly became Buddhist.

== Drivers of the Indianization of Southeast Asia ==
The key drivers of the Indianization of Southeast Asia were the Austronesian and Indian maritime trade especially the spice trade and the Maritime Silk Road- the Uttar patha and the Dakshin Patha,where major kingdoms like Mauryas and Satvahanas ruled a greater part of the route, the emissaries and the Buddhist missions of Ashoka the Great. Ashoka sent emissaries to Sri Lanka, Thailand,etc.to spread the teachings of Buddha far and wide.

== Indian maritime trade with Southeast Asia ==
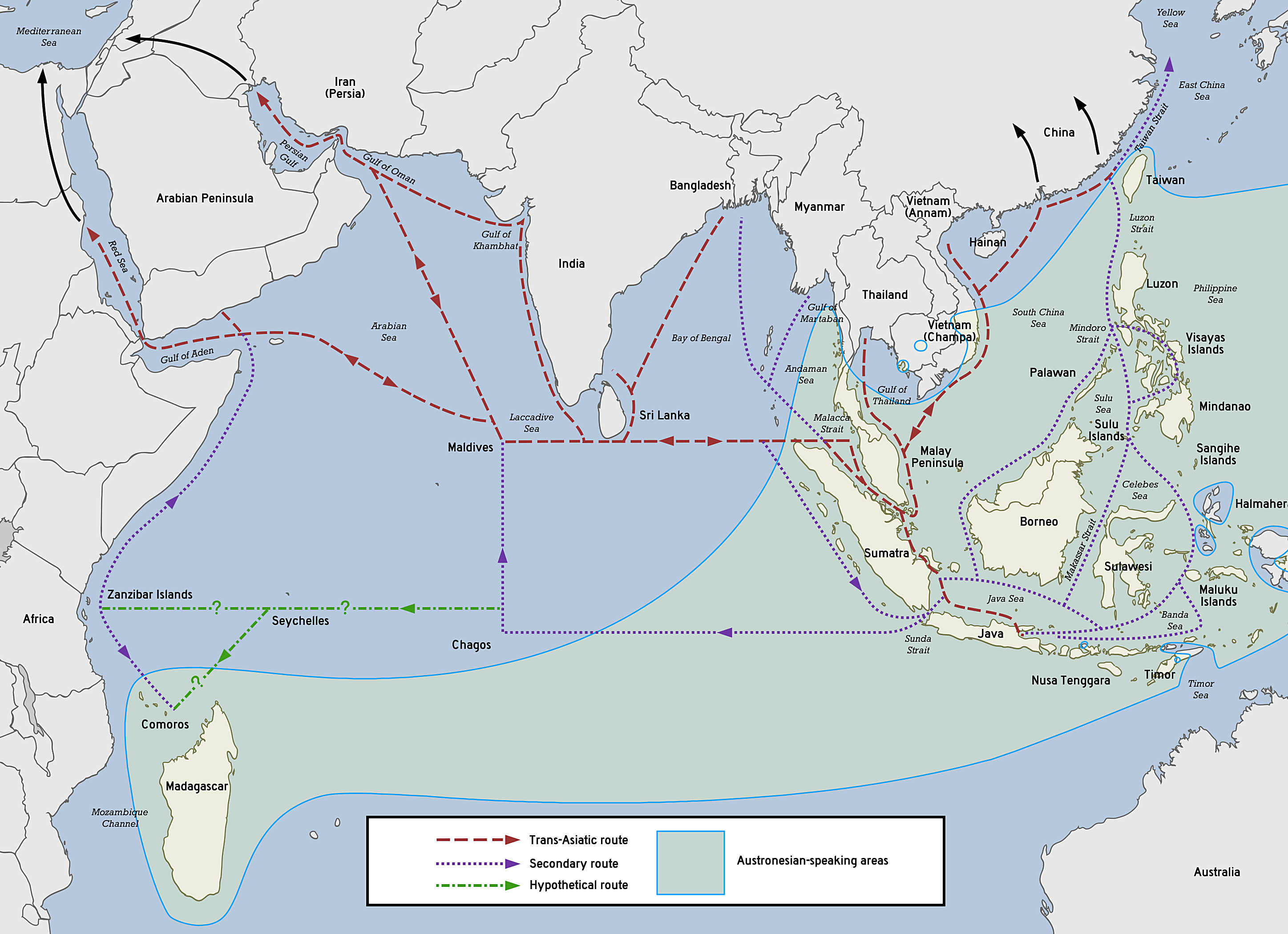
Austronesian proto-historic and historic maritime trade network in the Indian Ocean

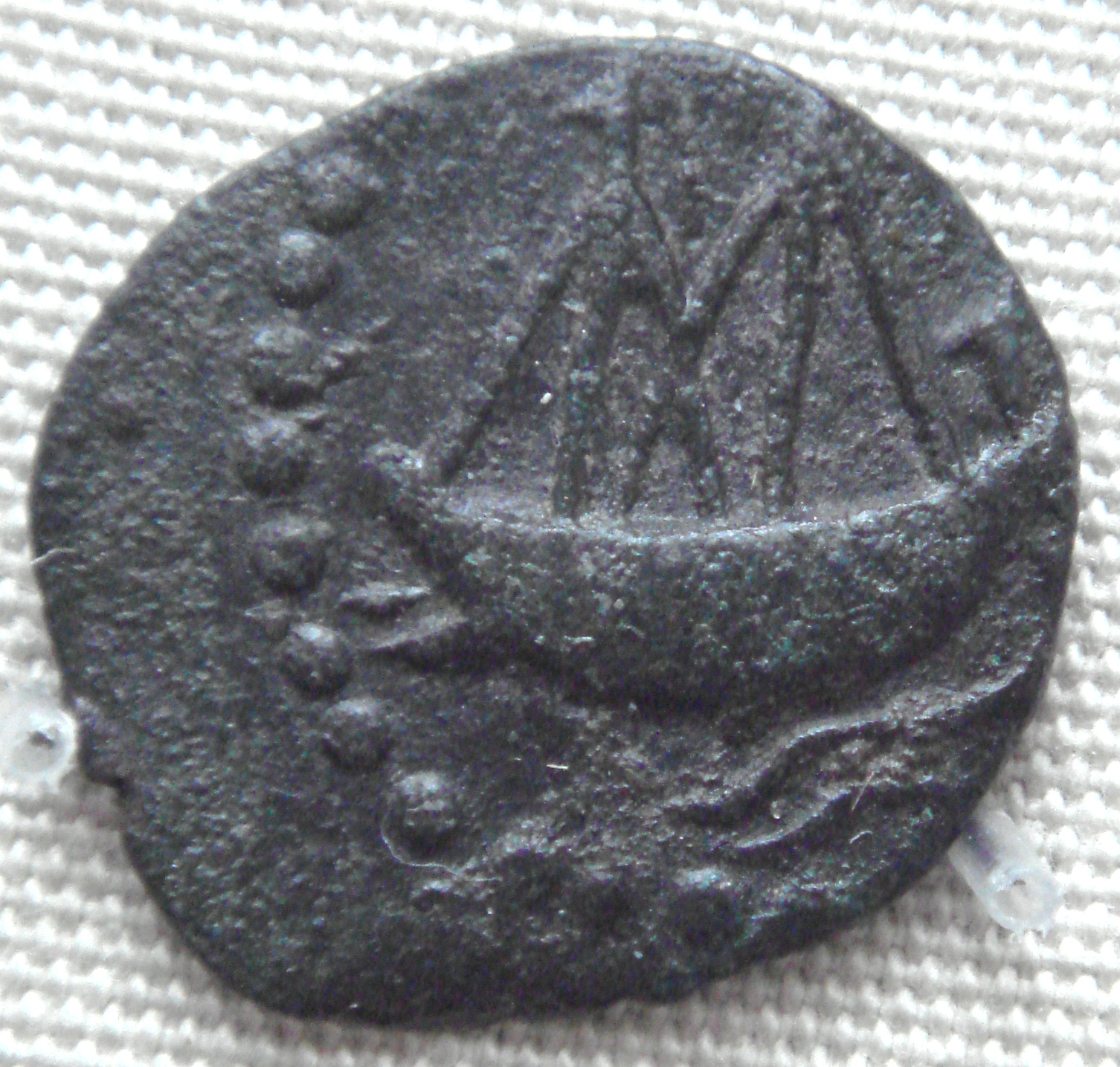
Indian ship on lead coin of Vasisthiputra Sri Pulamavi, testimony to the naval, seafaring and trading capabilities of the Satavahanas during the 1st–2nd century CE.

Austronesian sailors from Island Southeast Asia first established contact and trade with Southern India and Sri Lanka as early as 500 BCE. This resulted in the introduction of Southeast Asian material culture and cultigens to South Asia; as well as connecting the material cultures of India and China. These early Austronesian trade routes linking Island Southeast Asia with India also became the maritime aspect of the wider spice trade network, which were later also used by Tamil and Arab maritime trade. The sustained contact between Southeast Asia and South Asia resulted in cultural exchange, in addition to the exchange of commodities.

The first clear mention of a navy occurs in the mythological epic the Mahabharata. Historically, however, the first attested attempt to organise a navy in India, as described by Megasthenes (c. 350—290 BCE), is attributed to Chandragupta Maurya (reign 322—298 BCE). The Mauryan Empire (322–185 BCE) navy continued till the times of emperor Ashoka (reign 273—232 BCE), who used it to send massive diplomatic missions to Greece, Syria, Egypt, Cyrene, Macedonia and Epirus. Following nomadic interference in Siberia—one of the sources for India's bullion—India diverted its attention to the Malay Peninsula, which became its new source for gold and was soon exposed to the world via a series of maritime trade routes. The Mauryan period also witnessed various other regions of the world engage increasingly in the Indian Ocean maritime voyages. Between the 1st-2nd Century BCE, Satvahanas rose a major trader, owning a large section of the ports, where maritime trade like spices, textiles,sandalwood, etc. One more examples is of Socotra island in Middle east, where Guptas traded.

=== Buddhist missions ===
In the Sri Lankan tradition, Moggaliputta-Tissa – who is patronised by Ashoka – sends out nine Buddhist missions to spread Buddhism in the "border areas" in c. 250 BCE. This tradition does not credit Ashoka directly with sending these missions. Each mission comprises five monks, and is headed by an elder. To Sri Lanka, he sent his own son Mahinda, accompanied by four other Theras – Itthiya, Uttiya, Sambala and Bhaddasala. Next, with Moggaliputta-Tissa's help, Ashoka sent Buddhist missionaries to distant regions such as Kashmir, Gandhara, Himalayas, the land of the Yonas (Greeks), Maharashtra, Suvannabhumi, and Sri Lanka.

The Sri Lankan tradition dates these missions to Ashoka's 18th regnal year, naming the following missionaries:

- Mahinda to Sri Lanka
- Majjhantika to Kashmir and Gandhara
- Mahadeva to Mahisa-mandala (possibly modern Mysore region)
- Rakkhita to Vanavasa
- Dhammarakkhita the Greek to Aparantaka (western India)
- Maha-dhamma-rakkhita to Maharashtra
- Maharakkhita to the Greek country
- Majjhima to the Himalayas
- Soṇa and Uttara to Suvaṇṇabhūmi (possibly Lower Burma and Thailand)

The tradition adds that during his 19th regnal year, Ashoka's daughter Sanghamitta went to Sri Lanka to establish an order of nuns, taking a sapling of the sacred Bodhi Tree with her.

Scholars, such as Erich Frauwallner and Richard Gombrich, believe that the missions mentioned in the Sri Lankan tradition are historical. According to these scholars, a part of this story is corroborated by archaeological evidence: the Vinaya Nidana mentions names of five monks, who are said to have gone to the Himalayan region; three of these names have been found inscribed on relic caskets found at Bhilsa (near Vidisha). These caskets have been dated to the early 2nd century BCE, and the inscription states that the monks are of the Himalayan school. The missions may have set out from Vidisha in central India, as the caskets were discovered there, and as Mahinda is said to have stayed there for a month before setting out for Sri Lanka.

According to Gombrich, the mission may have included representatives of other religions, and thus, Lamotte's objection about "dhamma" is not valid. The Buddhist chroniclers may have decided not to mention these non-Buddhists, so as not to sideline Buddhism. Frauwallner and Gombrich also believe that Ashoka was directly responsible for the missions, since only a resourceful ruler could have sponsored such activities. The Sri Lankan chronicles, which belong to the Theravada school, exaggerate the role of the Theravadin monk Moggaliputta-Tissa in order to glorify their sect.

Some historians argue that Buddhism became a major religion because of Ashoka's royal patronage.

=== Early Common Era—High Middle Ages ===
Chola territories during Rajendra Chola I, c. 1030 CE.

During this era, Hindu and Buddhist religious establishments of Southeast Asia came to be associated with economic activity and commerce as patrons entrusted large funds which would later be used to benefit local economy by estate management, craftsmanship and promotion of trading activities. Buddhism, in particular, travelled alongside the maritime trade, promoting coinage, art and literacy.

In Java and Borneo, the introduction of Indian culture created a demand for aromatics, and trading posts here later served Chinese and Arab markets. The Periplus Maris Erythraei names several Indian ports from where large ships sailed in an easterly direction to Chryse. Products from the Maluku Islands that were shipped across the ports of Arabia to the Near East passed through the ports of India and Sri Lanka. After reaching either the Indian or the Sri Lankan ports, products were sometimes shipped to East Africa, where they were used for a variety of purposes including burial rites.

Maritime history of Odisha, known as Kalinga in ancient times, started before 350 BC according to early sources. The people of this region of eastern India along the coast of the Bay of Bengal sailed up and down the Indian coast, and travelled to Indochina and throughout Maritime Southeast Asia, introducing elements of their culture to the people with whom they traded. The 6th century Manjusrimulakalpa mentions the Bay of Bengal as 'Kalingodra' and historically the Bay of Bengal has been called 'Kalinga Sagara' (both Kalingodra and Kalinga Sagara mean Kalinga Sea), indicating the importance of Kalinga in the maritime trade. The old traditions are still celebrated in the annual Bali Jatra, or Boita-Bandana festival held for five days in October / November.

The Chola dynasty (300 BCE–1279) reached the peak of its influence and power during the medieval period. Emperors Rajaraja Chola I (reigned 985–1014) and Rajendra Chola I (reigned 1012–1044) extended the Chola kingdom beyond the traditional limits. At its peak, the Chola Empire stretched from the island of Sri Lanka in the south to the Godavari basin in the north. The kingdoms along the east coast of India up to the river Ganges acknowledged Chola suzerainty. Chola navies invaded and conquered Srivijaya and Srivijaya was the largest empire in Maritime Southeast Asia. Goods and ideas from India began to play a major role in the "Indianization" of the wider world from this period.

Quilon or Kollam in Kerala coast, once called Desinganadu, has had a high commercial reputation since the days of the Phoenicians and Romans. Fed by the Chinese trade, it was mentioned by Ibn Battuta in the 14th century as one of the five Indian ports he had seen in the course of his travels during twenty-four years. The Kollam Port became operational by AD.825, allowing Desinganadu's rulers to exchange the embassies with Chinese rulers and there was flourishing Chinese settlement at Quilon. The Indian commercial connection with Southeast Asia proved vital to the merchants of Arabia and Persia between the 7th and 8th centuries CE.

The kingdoms of Vijaynagara and Kalinga established footholds in Malaya, Sumatra and Western Java.

The Cholas excelled in foreign trade and maritime activity, extending their influence overseas to China and Southeast Asia. Towards the end of the 9th century, southern India had developed extensive maritime and commercial activity. The Cholas, being in possession of parts of both the west and the east coasts of peninsular India, were at the forefront of these ventures. The Tang dynasty (618–907) of China, the Srivijaya empire in Maritime Southeast Asia under the Sailendras, and the Abbasid Caliphate at Baghdad were the main trading partners.

During the reign of Pandya Parantaka Nedumjadaiyan (765–790), the Chera dynasty were a close ally of the Pallavas. Pallavamalla Nadivarman defeated the Pandya Varaguna with the help of a Chera king. Cultural contacts between the Pallava court and the Chera country were common. Indian spice exports find mention in the works of Ibn Khurdadhbeh (850), al-Ghafiqi (1150 CE), Ishak bin Imaran (907) and Al Kalkashandi (14th century). Chinese traveler Xuanzang mentions the town of Puri where "merchants depart for distant countries."

== Late Middle Ages ==
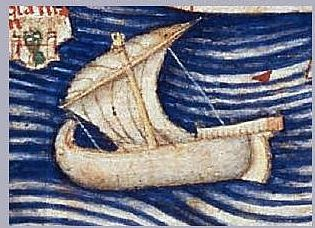
Indian vessel as shown in the Fra Mauro map (1460).

Ma Huan (1413–51) reached Cochin and noted that Indian coins, known as fanam, were issued in Cochin and weighed a total of one fen and one li according to the Chinese standards. They were of fine quality and could be exchanged in China for 15 silver coins of four-li weight each.

=== Maritime route ===
Maritime Silk Road or Maritime Silk Route refer to the maritime section of historic Silk Road that connects China to Southeast Asia, Indonesian archipelago, Indian subcontinent, Arabian Peninsula, all the way to Egypt and finally Europe.

The trade route encompassed numbers of bodies of waters; including South China Sea, Strait of Malacca, Indian Ocean, Gulf of Bengal, Arabian Sea, Persian Gulf and the Red Sea. The maritime route overlaps with historic Southeast Asian maritime trade, Spice trade, Indian Ocean trade and after 8th century – the Arabian naval trade network. The network also extend eastward to East China Sea and Yellow Sea to connect China with Korean Peninsula and Japanese archipelago.

=== Expansion of religions ===
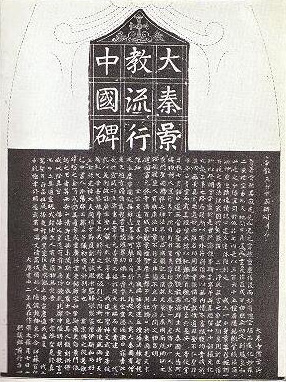
The Xi'an Stele, created in 781, describes the introduction of Christianity to China

Richard Foltz, Xinru Liu, and others have described how trading activities along the Silk Road over many centuries facilitated the transmission not just of goods but also ideas and culture, notably in the area of religions. Zoroastrianism, Judaism, Buddhism, Christianity, Manichaeism, and Islam all spread across Eurasia through trade networks that were tied to specific religious communities and their institutions. Notably, established Buddhist monasteries along the Silk Road offered a haven, as well as a new religion for foreigners.

The spread of religions and cultural traditions along the Silk Roads, according to Jerry H. Bentley, also led to syncretism. One example was the encounter with the Chinese and Xiongnu nomads. These unlikely events of cross-cultural contact allowed both cultures to adapt to each other as an alternative. The Xiongnu adopted Chinese agricultural techniques, dress style, and lifestyle, while the Chinese adopted Xiongnu military techniques, some dress style, music, and dance. Perhaps most surprising of the cultural exchanges between China and the Xiongnu, Chinese soldiers sometimes defected and converted to the Xiongnu way of life, and stayed in the steppes for fear of punishment.

Nomadic mobility played a key role in facilitating inter-regional contacts and cultural exchanges along the ancient Silk Roads.

==== Transmission of Buddhism ====
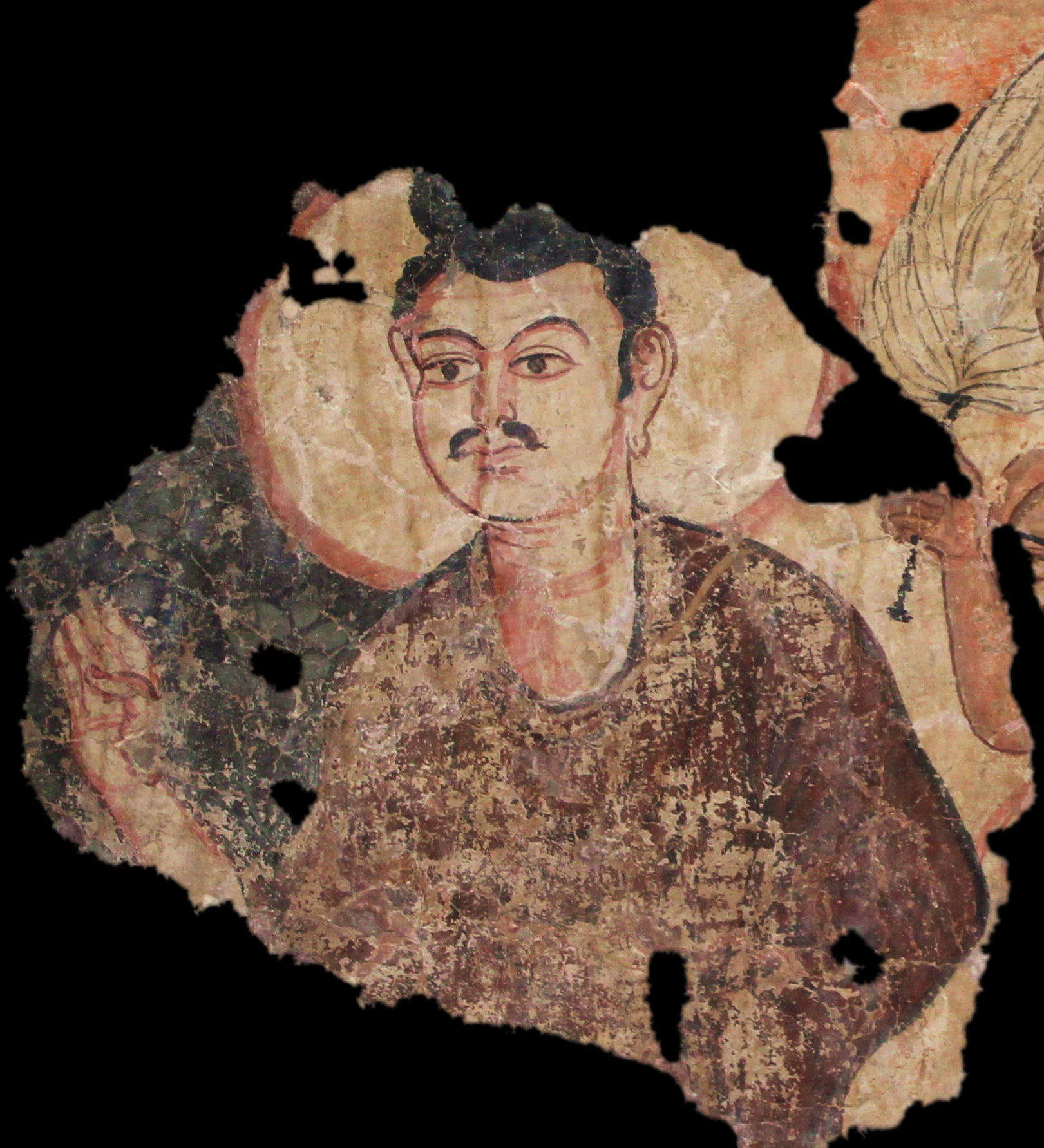
Fragment of a wall painting depicting Buddha from a stupa in Miran along the Silk Road (200AD - 400AD)

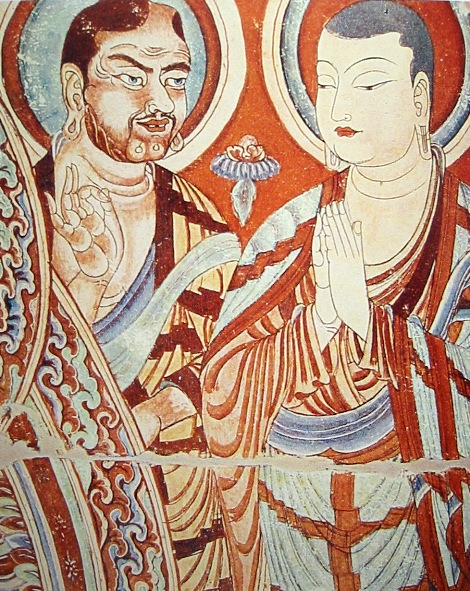
A blue-eyed Central Asian monk teaching an East-Asian monk, Bezeklik, Turfan, eastern Tarim Basin, China, 9th century; the monk on the right is possibly Tocharian, although more likely Sogdian.

Buddhist knowledge among people on the Silk Road increased when Emperor Ashoka of the Maurya dynasty (268–239 BCE) converted to Buddhism and raised the religion to official status in his northern Indian empire. The transmission of Buddhism to China via the Silk Road became prominent in the 1st century CE, according to a semi-legendary account of an ambassador sent to the West by the Chinese Emperor Ming (58–75). During this period Buddhism began to spread throughout Southeast, East, and Central Asia. Mahayana, Theravada, and Tibetan Buddhism are the three primary forms of Buddhism that spread across Asia via the Silk Road.

The Buddhist movement was the first large-scale missionary movement in the history of world religions. Chinese missionaries were able to assimilate Buddhism, to an extent, to native Chinese Daoists, which brought the two beliefs together. Buddha's community of followers, the Sangha, consisted of male and female monks and laity. These people moved through India and beyond to spread the ideas of Buddha. As the number of members within the Sangha increased, it became costly so that only the larger cities were able to afford having the Buddha and his disciples visit. It is believed that under the control of the Kushans, Buddhism was spread to China and other parts of Asia from the middle of the first century to the middle of the third century. Extensive contacts started in the 2nd century, probably as a consequence of the expansion of the Kushan empire into the territory of the Tarim Basin, due to the missionary efforts of a great number of Buddhist monks to Chinese lands. The first missionaries and translators of Buddhists scriptures into Chinese were either Parthian, Kushan, Sogdian, or Kuchean.

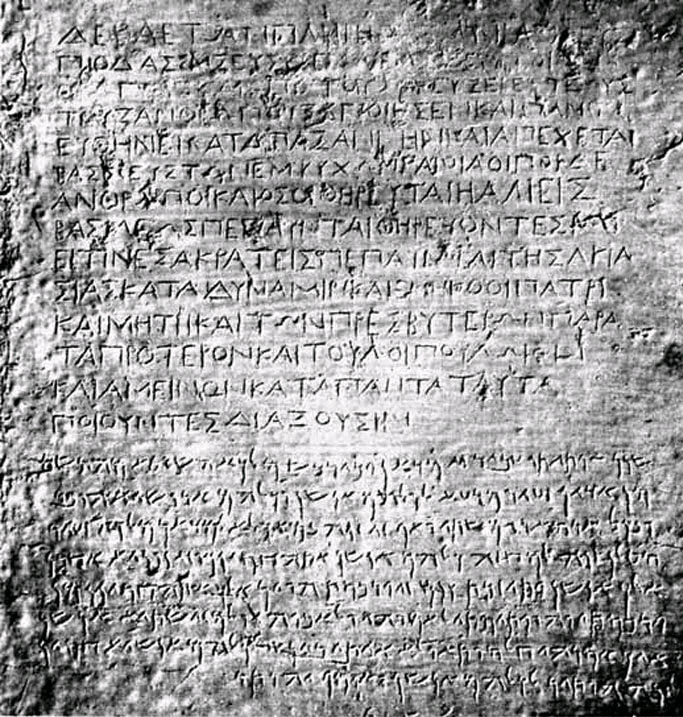
Bilingual edict (Greek and Aramaic) by Indian Buddhist King Ashoka, 3rd century BCE; see Edicts of Ashoka, from Kandahar. This edict advocates the adoption of "godliness" using the Greek term Eusebeia for Dharma. Kabul Museum.

One result of the spread of Buddhism along the Silk Road was displacement and conflict. The Greek Seleucids were exiled to Iran and Central Asia because of a new Iranian dynasty called the Parthians at the beginning of the 2nd century BCE, and as a result the Parthians became the new middle men for trade in a period when the Romans were major customers for silk. Parthian scholars were involved in one of the first Buddhist text translations into the Chinese language. Its main trade centre on the Silk Road, the city of Merv, in due course and with the coming of age of Buddhism in China, became a major Buddhist centre by the middle of the 2nd century.

From the 4th century CE onward, Chinese pilgrims also started to travel on the Silk Road to India to get improved access to the original Buddhist scriptures, with Fa-hsien's pilgrimage to India (395–414), and later Xuanzang (629–644) and Hyecho, who traveled from Korea to India. The travels of the priest Xuanzang were fictionalized in the 16th century in a fantasy adventure novel called Journey to the West, which told of trials with demons and the aid given by various disciples on the journey.

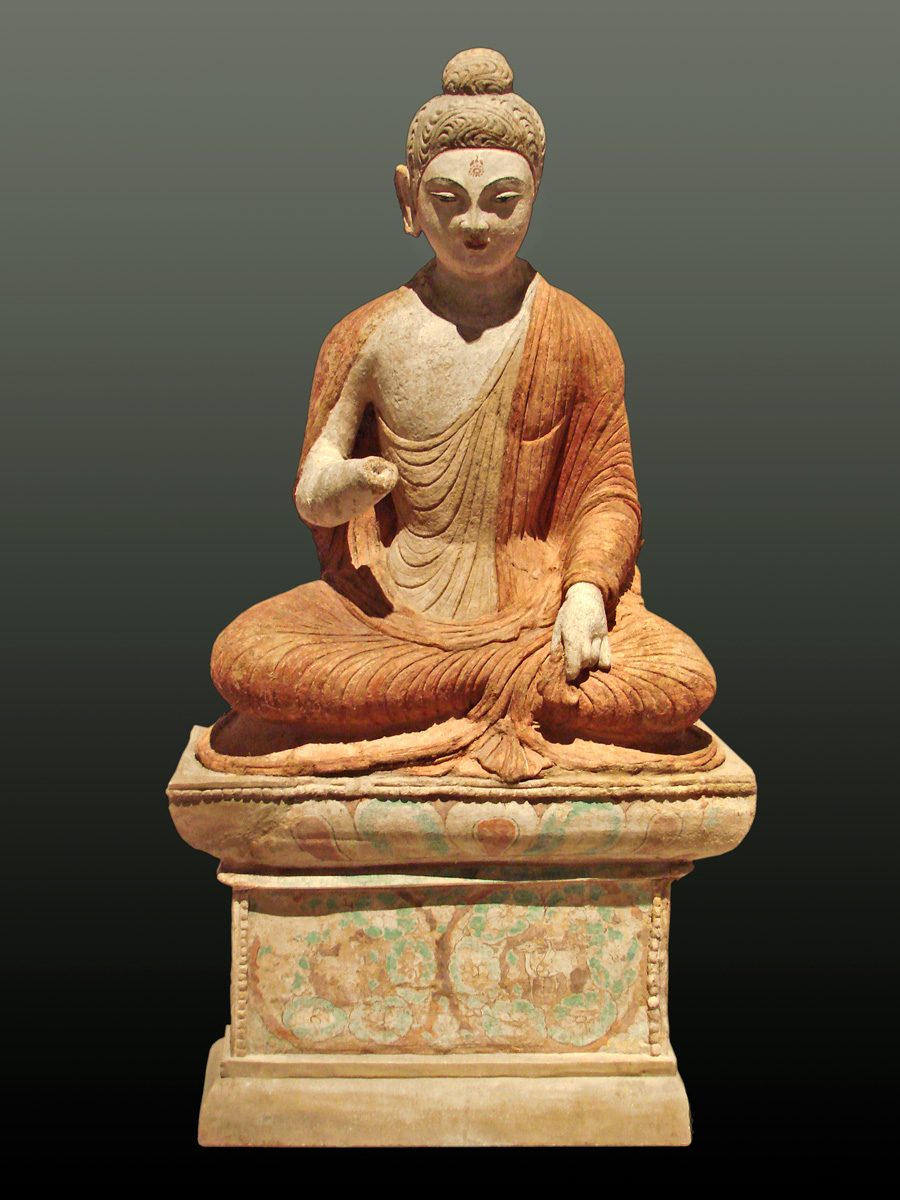
A statue depicting Buddha giving a sermon, from Sarnath, 3,000 km (1,864 mi) southwest of Ürümqi, Xinjiang, 8th century

There were many different schools of Buddhism travelling on the Silk Road. The Dharmaguptakas and the Sarvastivadins were two of the major Nikaya schools. These were both eventually displaced by the Mahayana, also known as "Great Vehicle". This movement of Buddhism first gained influence in the Khotan region. The Mahayana, which was more of a "pan-Buddhist movement" than a school of Buddhism, appears to have begun in northwestern India or Central Asia. It formed during the 1st century BCE and was small at first, and the origins of this "Greater Vehicle" are not fully clear. Some Mahayana scripts were found in northern Pakistan, but the main texts are still believed to have been composed in Central Asia along the Silk Road. These different schools and movements of Buddhism were a result of the diverse and complex influences and beliefs on the Silk Road. With the rise of Mahayana Buddhism, the initial direction of Buddhist development changed. This form of Buddhism highlighted, as stated by Xinru Liu, "the elusiveness of physical reality, including material wealth." It also stressed getting rid of material desire to a certain point; this was often difficult for followers to understand.

During the 5th and 6th centuries CE, merchants played a large role in the spread of religion, in particular Buddhism. Merchants found the moral and ethical teachings of Buddhism an appealing alternative to previous religions. Merchants supported Buddhist monasteries along the Silk Road, and in return the Buddhists gave the merchants somewhere to stay as they traveled from city to city. As a result, merchants spread Buddhism to foreign encounters as they traveled. Merchants also helped to establish diaspora within the communities they encountered, and over time their cultures became based on Buddhism. These communities became centers of literacy and culture with well-organized marketplaces, lodging, and storage. The voluntary conversion of Chinese ruling elites helped the spread of Buddhism in East Asia and led Buddhism to become widespread in Chinese society. The Silk Road transmission of Buddhism essentially ended in Central Asia around the 7th century with the rise of Islam.

== Brunei ==
=== Hindu-Buddhist kingdoms (? - ~1400) ===
The history of Brunei before the arrival of Magellan's ships in 1519-1522 CE is based on the interpretation of Chinese sources and local legends. Historians believe that there was a forerunner Indianised Hindu-Buddhist state to the present day Brunei Sultanate. One predecessor state was called Vijayapura, which possibly existed in northwest Borneo in the 7th century. (Note: Not to be confused with the Indian state of the same name.) It was probably a subject state of the powerful Indianised Hindu-Buddhist Srivijaya empire based in Sumatra. One predecessor state was called Po-ni (pinyin: Boni). By the 10th century Po-ni had contacts with first the Song dynasty and at some point even entered into a tributary relationship with China. By the 14th century Po-ni also fell under the influence of the Indianised Hindu Javanese Majapahit Empire. The book of Nagarakretagama, canto 14, written by Prapanca in 1365 mentioned Berune as a vassal state of Majahpahit. However this may have been nothing more than a symbolic relationship, as one account of the annual tribute owed each year to Majahpahit was a jar of areca juice obtained from the young green nuts of the areca palm. The Ming dynasty resumed communications with Po-ni in the 1370s and the Po-ni ruler Ma-na-jih-chia-na visited the Ming capital Nanjing in 1408 and died there; his tomb was rediscovered in the 20th century, and is now a protected monument.

=== Indianised Islamic sultanate (~1400 - present day) ===
In 1402, Sultan Muhammad Shah died, he was first to convert from Hindu-Buddhism to Islam, and his pre-conversion name was Awang Alak Betatar.

== Burma (Myanmar) ==
At the western end of the South East Asian mainland, Lower Burma was occupied by the Mon peoples who are thought to have come originally from western China. In Lower Burma they supplanted an earlier people: the Pyu, of whom little is known except that they practised Hinduism.

=== Arrival of Buddhism and impact of Indian literature (3rd century CE onward) ===
The Mons strongly influenced by their contacts with Indian traders during the 3rd century B.C adopted Indian literature and art and the Buddhist religion. The Mons were one of the earliest known civilizations in Southeast Asia. They consisted of several Mon kingdoms, spreading from Lower Burma into much of Thailand, where they founded the kingdom of Dvaravati. Their principal settlements in Burma were Thaton Kingdom and Pegu.

=== Tibeto-Burman Buddhist kingdoms (11th - 13th century CE ) ===
From about the 9th century onward Tibeto-Burman tribes moved south from the hills east of Tibet into the Irrawaddy plain. They founded their capital at Bagan in Upper Burma in the 10th century. They eventually absorbed the Mons, their cities and adopted the Mon civilization and Buddhism. The Bagan Kingdom united all Burma under one rule for 200 years - from the 11th to 13th centuries. The zenith of its power occurred during the reign of King Anawratha (1044–1077), who conquered the Mon kingdom of Thaton. King Anawratha built many of the temples for which Bagan is famous. It is estimated that some 13,000 temples once existed within the city, which some 5,000 still stand.

=== 13th-21st century ===
In the 14th century, the Delhi Sultanate controlled nearly all the territory that comprises present-day India. However, invaders from Central Asia weakened and broke up the sultanate's empire before it was swept aside by the Mughals in 1526.

== Cambodia ==
=== Funan ===
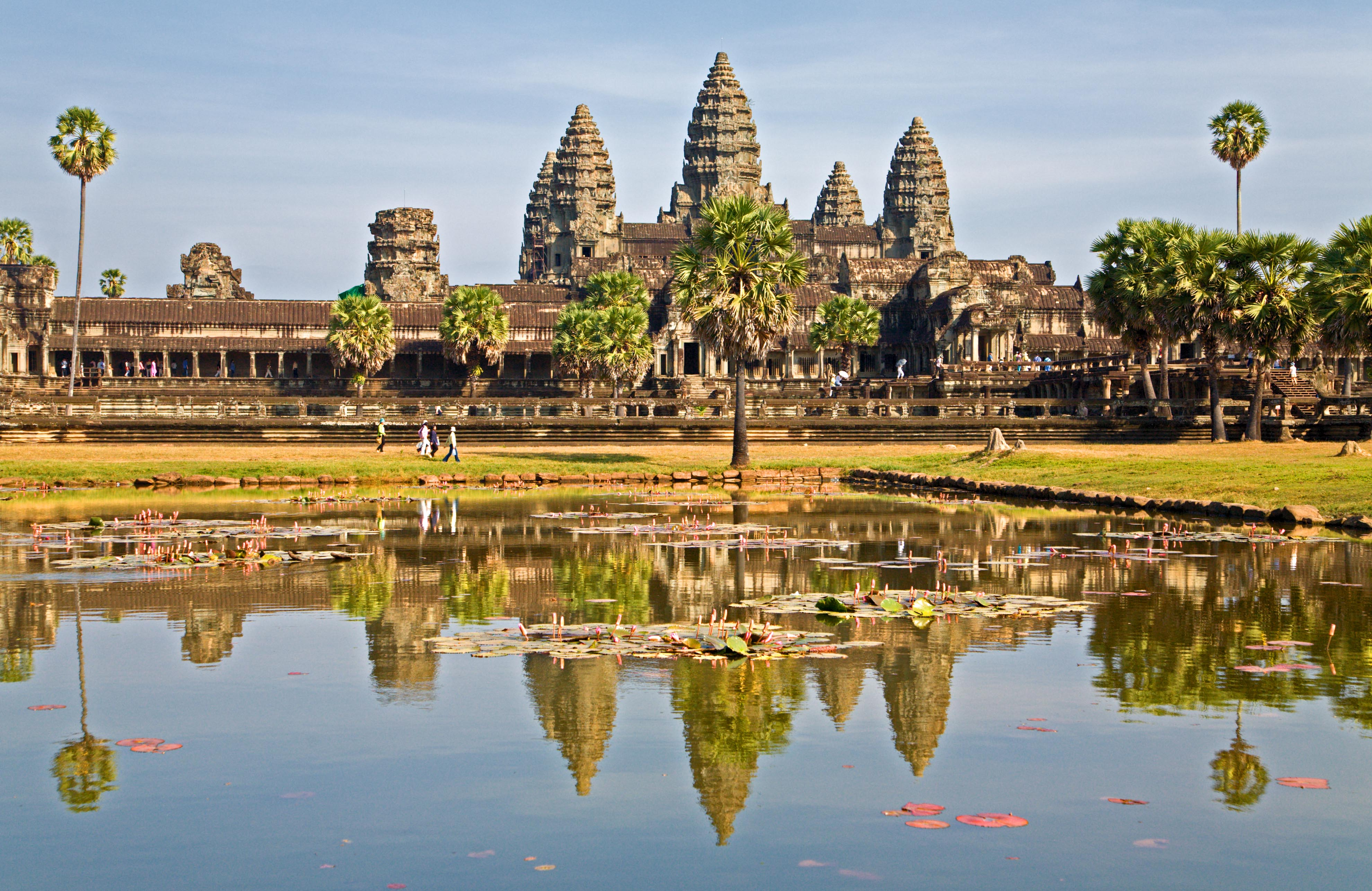
Angkor Wat

The first of these Hinduised states to achieve widespread importance was the Kingdom of Funan founded in the 1st century CE in what is now Cambodia — according to legend, after the marriage of a merchant monk Kaundinya I with princess Soma who was the daughter of the chieftain of the local Nāga clan. Funan flourished for some 500 years. It carried on a prosperous trade with India and China, and its engineers developed an extensive canal system. An elite practised statecraft, art and science, based on Indian culture. Vassal kingdoms spread to southern Vietnam in the east and to the Malay Peninsula in the west.

=== Chenla and Angkor ===
In the late 6th century CE, dynastic struggles caused the collapse of the Funan empire. It was succeeded by another Hindu-Khmer state, Chenla, which lasted until the 9th century. Then a Khmer king, Jayavarman II (about 800–850) established a capital at Angkor in central Cambodia. He founded a cult which identified the king with the Hindu God Shiva – one of the triad of Hindu gods, Brahma the creator, Vishnu the preserver, Shiva the god symbolising destruction and reproduction. The Angkor empire flourished from the 9th to the early 13th century. It reached the peak of its fame under Jayavarman VII at the end of the 12th century, when its conquests extended into Thailand in the west (where it had conquered the Mon kingdom of Dwaravati) and into Champa in the east. Its most celebrated memorial is the great temple of Angkor Wat, built early in the 12th century. This summarises the position on the South East Asian mainland until about the 12th century. Meanwhile, from about the 6th century, and until the 14th century, there was a series of great maritime empires based on the Indonesian islands of Sumatra and Java. In early days these Indians came mostly from the ancient kingdom of Kalinga, on the southeastern coast of India. Indians in Indonesia are still known as "Klings", derived from Kalinga.

== East Timor ==
The later Timorese were not seafarers, rather they were land focused peoples who did not make contact with other islands and peoples by sea. Timor was part of a region of small islands with small populations of similarly land-focused peoples that now make up eastern Indonesia. Contact with the outside world was via networks of foreign seafaring traders from as far as China and India that served the archipelago. Outside products brought to the region included metal goods, rice, fine textiles, and coins exchanged for local spices, sandalwood, deer horn, bees' wax, and slaves.

=== Indianised Hindu-Buddhist kingdoms ===
==== Indianised Javanese Hindu-Buddhist Srivijaya empire (7th - 12th century) ====
Oral traditions of people of Wehali principality of East Timor mention their migration from Sina Mutin Malaka or "Chinese White Malacca" (part of Indianised Hindu-Buddhist Srivijaya empire) in ancient times.

==== As a vassal of the Indianized Javanese Hindu empire of Majapahit (12th - 16th century) ====
Nagarakretagama, the chronicles of the Majapahit empire called Timor a tributary, but as Portuguese chronologist Tomé Pires wrote in the 16th century, all islands east of Java were called "Timor". Indonesian nationalist used the Majapahit chronicles to claim East Timor as part of Indonesia.

===== Trade with China =====
Timor is mentioned in the 13th-century Chinese Zhu Fan Zhi, where it is called Ti-wu and is noted for its sandalwood. It is called Ti-men in the History of Song of 1345. Writing towards 1350, Wang Dayuan refers to a Ku-li Ti-men, which is a corruption of Giri Timor, meaning island of Timor. Giri from "mountain" in Sanskrit, thus "mountainous island of Timor".

===== Chiefdoms or polities =====
Early European explorers report that the island had a number of small chiefdoms or princedoms in the early 16th century. One of the most significant is the Wehali or Wehale kingdom in central Timor, to which the Tetum, Bunak and Kemak ethnic groups were aligned.

=== European colonisation and Christianisation (16th century onward) ===
Beginning in the early sixteenth century, European colonialists—the Dutch in the island's west, and Portuguese in the east—would divide the island, isolating the East Timorese from the histories of the surrounding archipelago.

== Indonesia ==
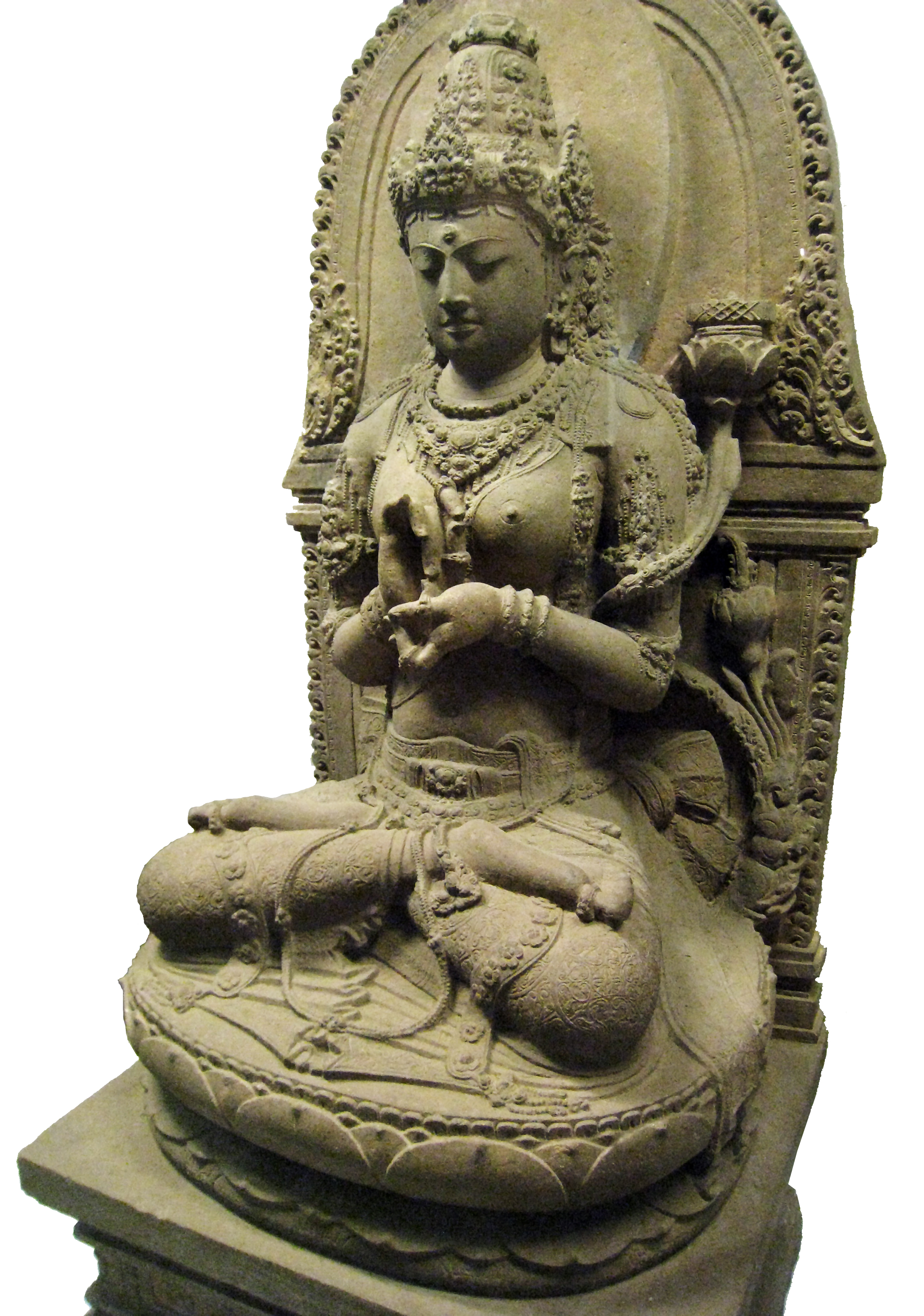
An exquisite statue of Prajñāpāramitā from 13th century Singhasari, East Java, seated in lotus position on a lotus throne performing dharmachakra-mudra.

Approximately for more than a millennia, between 5th to 15th centuries, the various Indianised states and empires flourished in the Indonesian archipelago; from the era of Tarumanagara to Majapahit. Though founded possibly by either early Indian settlers or by native polities that adopted Indian culture, and have maintaining diplomatic contacts with India, these archipelagic Hindu-Buddhist kingdoms remained politically independent from the kingdoms of Indian subcontinent.

=== Srivijaya empire ===
The Indonesian archipelago saw the rise of Hindu-Buddhist empires of Sumatra and Java. In the islands of Southeast Asia, one of the first organised state to achieve fame was the Buddhist Malay kingdom of Srivijaya, with its capital at Palembang in southern Sumatra. Its commercial pre-eminence was based on command of the sea route from India to China between Sumatra and the Malay Peninsula (later known as the Straits of Malacca). In the 6th – 7th centuries Srivijaya succeeded Funan as the leading state in Southeast Asia. Its ruler was the overlord of the Malay Peninsula and western Java as well as Sumatra. During the era of Srivijaya, Buddhism became firmly entrenched there.

=== Sailendra dynasty ===
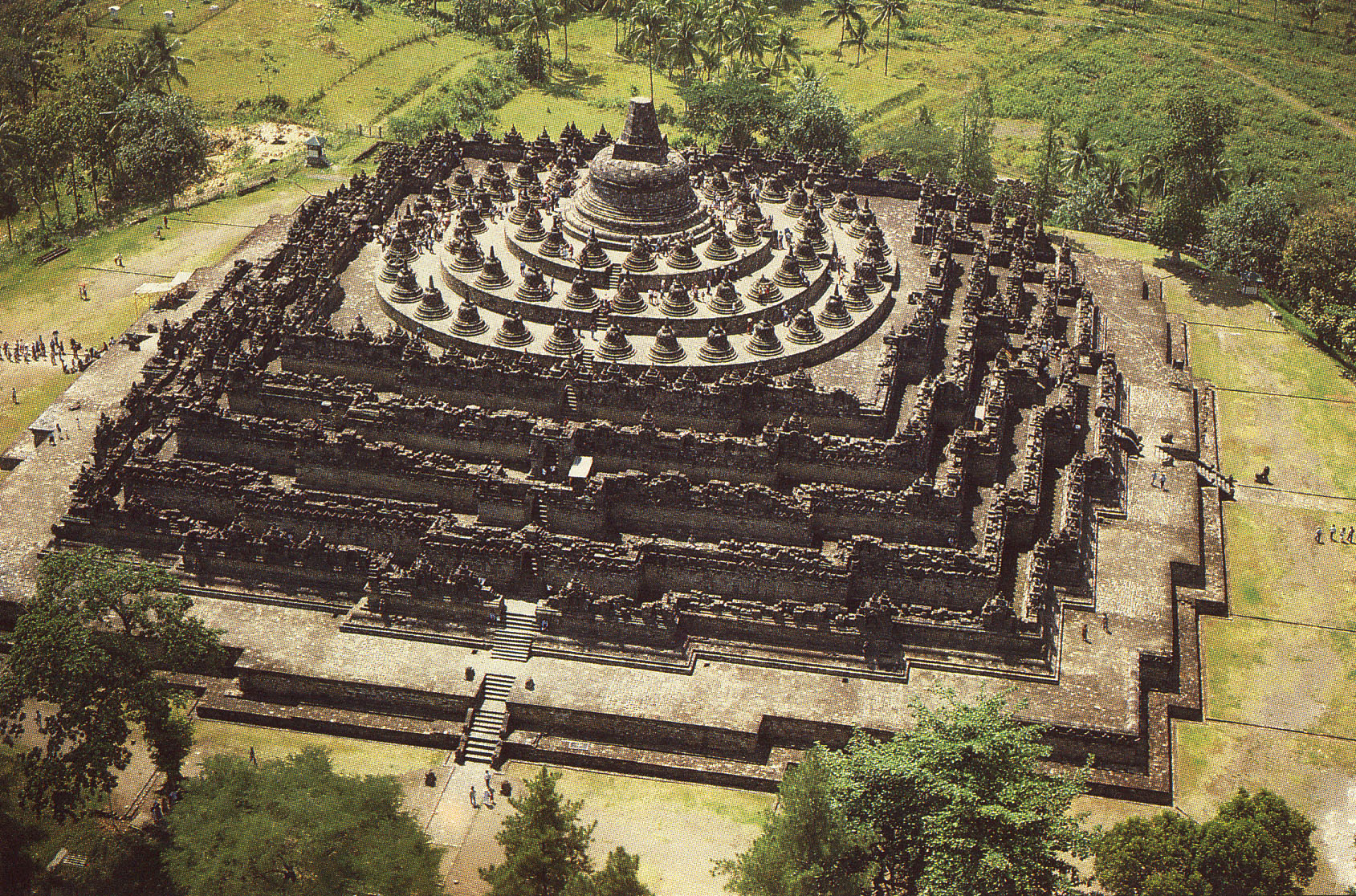
Aerial view of 9th century Borobudur, the elaborate stupas took the form of a step pyramid and mandala plan, built by King Samaratungga of Shailendra dynasty, ruler of Mataram kingdom.

The expansion of Srivijaya was resisted in eastern Java, where the powerful Buddhist Sailendra dynasty arose. From the 7th century onwards there was great activity in temple building in central Java. The most impressive of the ruins is at Borobudur, considered to have been the largest Buddhist temple in the world. Sailendra rule spread to southern Sumatra, and up to the Malay Peninsula to Cambodia (where it was replaced by the Angkorian kingdom). In the 9th century, the Sailendras moved to Sumatra, and a union of Srivijaya and the Sailendras formed an empire which dominated much of Southeast Asia for the next five centuries. After 500 Years of supremacy, Srivijaya was superseded by Majapahit.

=== Mataram kingdom ===
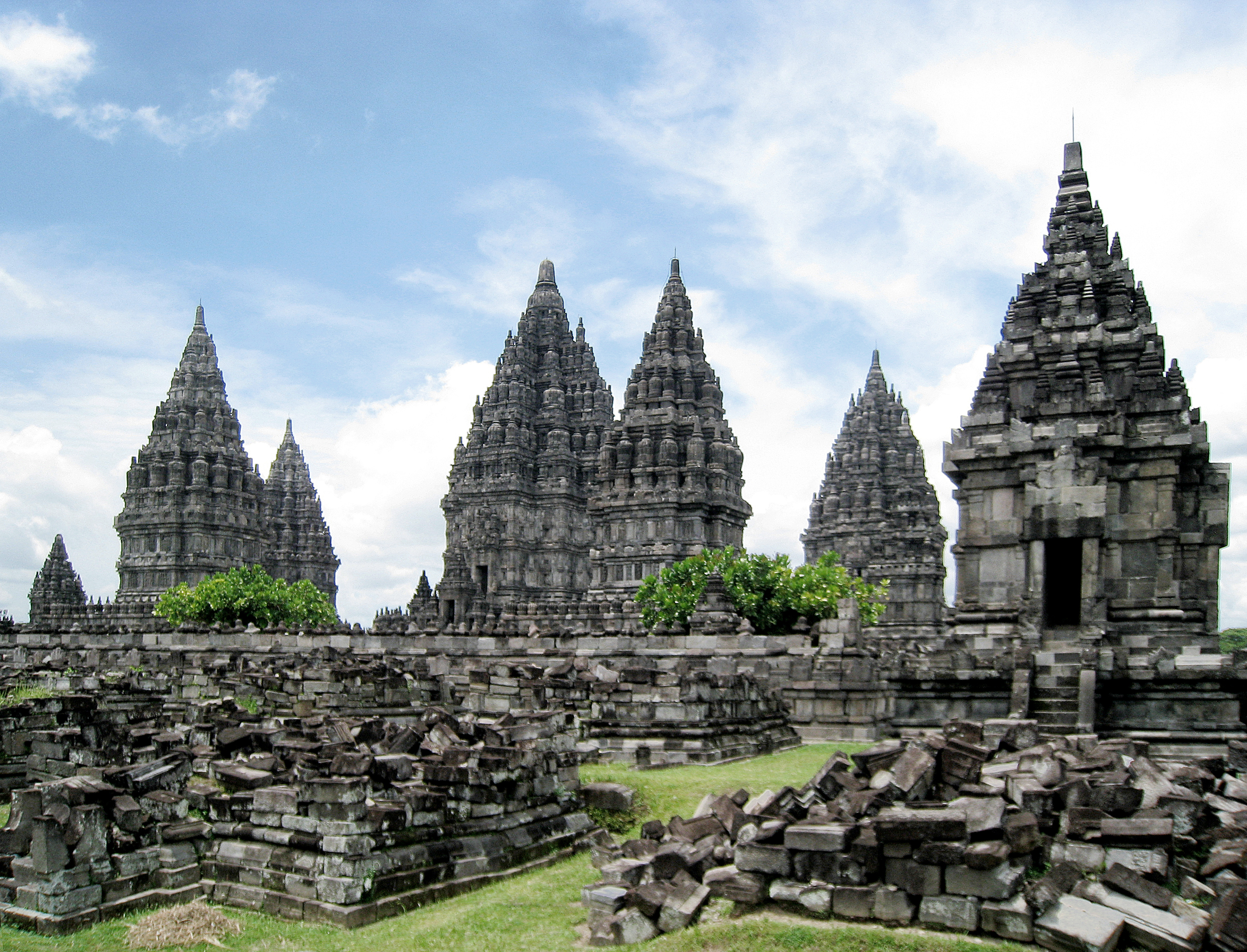
The 9th-century Shivaistic temple of Prambanan in Central Java near Yogyakarta, the largest Hindu temple in Indonesia

In the 10th century, Mataram to the challenged the supremacy of Srivijaya, resulting in the destruction of the Mataram capital by Srivijaya early in the 11th century. Restored by King Airlangga (c. 1020–1050), the kingdom split on his death and the new state of Kediri was formed in eastern Java.

=== Kediri kingdom ===
Kediri kingdom, spread its influence to the eastern part of Southeast Asia and became the centre of Javanese culture for the next two centuries. The spice trade was now becoming of increasing importance, as the demand by European countries for spices grew. Before they learned to keep sheep and cattle alive in the winter, they had to eat salted meat, made palatable by the addition of spices. One of the main sources was the Maluku Islands (or "Spice Islands") in Indonesia, and Kediri became a strong trading nation.

=== Singhasari kingdom ===
In the 13th century, however, the Kediri dynasty was overthrown by a revolution, and Singhasari arose in east Java. The domains of this new state expanded under the rule of its warrior-king Kertanegara. He was killed by a prince of the previous Kediri dynasty, who then established the last great Hindu-Javanese kingdom, Majapahit.

=== Majapahit empire ===
With the departure of the Sailendras and the fall of Singhasari, a new Majapahit kingdom appeared in eastern Java, which reverted from Buddhism to Hinduism. By the middle of the 14th century, Majapahit controlled most of Java, Sumatra and the Malay Peninsula, part of Borneo, the southern Celebes and the Moluccas. It also exerted considerable influence on the mainland.

== Laos ==
=== Funan kingdom ===
The first indigenous kingdom to emerge in Indochina was referred to in Chinese histories as the Kingdom of Funan and encompassed an area of modern Cambodia, and the coasts of southern Vietnam and southern Thailand since the 1st century CE. Funan was an Indianised kingdom, that had incorporated central aspects of Indian institutions, religion, statecraft, administration, culture, epigraphy, writing and architecture and engaged in profitable Indian Ocean trade.

=== Champa kingdom ===
By the 2nd century CE, Austronesian settlers had established an Indianised kingdom known as Champa along modern central Vietnam. The Cham people established the first settlements near modern Champasak in Laos. Funan expanded and incorporated the Champasak region by the sixth century CE, when it was replaced by its successor polity Chenla. Chenla occupied large areas of modern-day Laos as it accounts for the earliest kingdom on Laotian soil.

=== Chenla kingdom ===
The capital of early Chenla was Shrestapura which was located in the vicinity of Champasak and the UNESCO World Heritage Site of Wat Phu. Wat Phu is a vast temple complex in southern Laos which combined natural surroundings with ornate sandstone structures, which were maintained and embellished by the Chenla peoples until 900 CE, and were subsequently rediscovered and embellished by the Khmer in the 10th century. By the 8th century CE Chenla had divided into "Land Chenla" located in Laos, and "Water Chenla" founded by Mahendravarman near Sambor Prei Kuk in Cambodia. Land Chenla was known to the Chinese as "Po Lou" or "Wen Dan" and dispatched a trade mission to the Tang dynasty court in 717 CE. Water Chenla, would come under repeated attack from Champa, the Medang sea kingdoms in Indonesia based in Java, and finally pirates. From the instability the Khmer emerged.

=== Khmer kingdom ===
Under the king Jayavarman II the Khmer Empire began to take shape in the 9th century CE.

=== Dvaravati city state kingdoms ===
In the area which is modern northern and central Laos, and northeast Thailand the Mon people established their own kingdoms during the 8th century CE, outside the reach of the contracting Chenla kingdoms. By the 6th century in the Chao Phraya River Valley, Mon peoples had coalesced to create the Dvaravati kingdoms. In the 8th century CE, Sri Gotapura (Sikhottabong) was the strongest of these early city states, and controlled trade throughout the middle Mekong region. The city states were loosely bound politically, but were culturally similar and introduced Therevada Buddhism from Sri Lankan missionaries throughout the region.

== Malaysia ==
The Malay Peninsula was settled by prehistoric people 80,000 years ago. Another batch of peoples the deutro Malay migrated from southern China within 10,000 years ago. Upon arrival in the peninsula some of them mix with the Australoid. This gave the appearance of the Malays. It was suggested that the visiting ancient Dravidians named the peoples of the Malay Peninsula and Sumatera as "Malay ur" meant hills and city based on the geographical terrain of Peninsular Malaysia and Sumatera. Claudius Ptolemaeus (Greek: Κλαύδιος Πτολεμαῖος; c. 90 – c. 168), known in English as Ptolemy, was a Greek geographer, astronomer, and astrologer who had written about Golden Chersonese, which indicates trade with the Indian Sub-Continent and China has existed since the 1st century AD. Archeologist have found relic and ruin in Bujang Valley settlement dating back at 110AD. The settlement is believed to be the oldest civilization in Southeast Asia influenced by ancient Indians. Today, Malaysians of direct Indian descent account for approximately 7 per cent of the total population of Malaysia (approximately. 2 million)

Hinduism and Buddhism from India dominated early regional history, reaching their peak during the reign of the Sumatra-based Srivijaya civilisation, whose influence extended through Sumatra, Java, the Malay Peninsula and much of Borneo from the 7th to the 13th centuries, which later gradually defeated and converted to Islam in 14th and 15th century before the European colonisation began in the 16th century.

=== Indianised Hindu-Buddhist kingdoms (3rd century BCE to 14th century CE) ===
==== Early trade and Indian settlements ====
In the first millennium CE, Malays became the dominant race on the peninsula. The small early states that were established were greatly influenced by Indian culture, as was most of Southeast Asia. Indian influence in the region dates back to at least the 3rd century BCE. Tamil culture was spread to Southeast Asia by the Tamil Pallava dynasty in the 4th and 5th century.

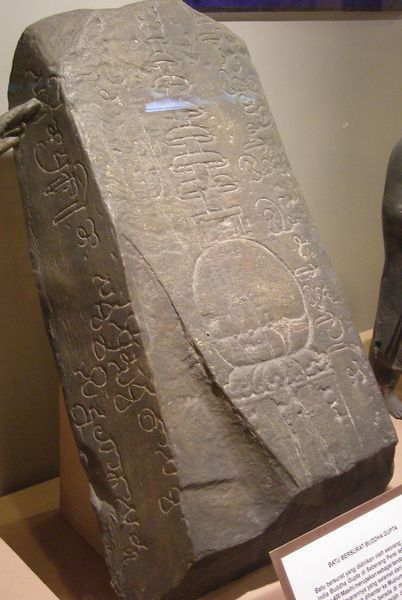
The Buddha-Gupta stone, dating to the 4th–5th century CE, was dedicated by an Indian Merchant, Buddha Gupta, as an expression of gratitude for his safe arrival after a voyage to the Malay peninsula. It was found in Seberang Perai, Malaysia and is kept in the National Museum, Calcutta, India.

In ancient Indian literature, the term Suvarnadvipa or the "Golden Peninsula" is used in Ramayana, and some argued that it may be a reference to the Malay Peninsula. The ancient Indian text Vayu Purana also mentioned a place named Malayadvipa where gold mines may be found, and this term has been proposed to mean possibly Sumatra and the Malay Peninsula. The Malay Peninsula was shown on Ptolemy's map as the "Golden Khersonese". He referred to the Straits of Malacca as Sinus Sabaricus.

Trade relations with China and India were established in the 1st century BC. Shards of Chinese pottery have been found in Borneo dating from the 1st century following the southward expansion of the Han dynasty. In the early centuries of the first millennium, the people of the Malay Peninsula adopted the Indian religions of Hinduism and Buddhism, religions which had a major effect on the language and culture of those living in Malaysia. The Sanskrit writing system was used as early as the 4th century.

==== Indianised Hindu Malay kingdoms (3rd century to 7th century) ====
There were numerous Malay kingdoms in the 2nd and 3rd century, as many as 30, mainly based on the Eastern side of the Malay Peninsula. Among the earliest kingdoms known to have been based in the Malay Peninsula is the ancient kingdom of Langkasuka, located in the northern Malay Peninsula and based somewhere on the west coast. It was closely tied to Funan in Cambodia, which also ruled part of northern Malaysia until the 6th century. In the 5th century, the Kingdom of Pahang was mentioned in the Book of Song. According to the Sejarah Melayu ("Malay Annals"), the Khmer prince Raja Ganji Sarjuna founded the kingdom of Gangga Negara (modern-day Beruas, Perak) in the 700s. Chinese chronicles of the 5th century CE speak of a great port in the south called Guantoli, which is thought to have been in the Straits of Malacca. In the 7th century, a new port called Shilifoshi is mentioned, and this is believed to be a Chinese rendering of Srivijaya.

==== Indianised Hindu-Buddhist Malay kingdoms as vassal of Srivijaya empire (7th - 13th century) ====
Between the 7th and the 13th century, much of the Malay Peninsula was under the Buddhist Srivijaya empire. The site of Srivijaya's centre is thought be at a river mouth in eastern Sumatra, based near what is now Palembang. For over six centuries the Maharajahs of Srivijaya ruled a maritime empire that became the main power in the archipelago. The empire was based around trade, with local kings (dhatus or community leaders) swearing allegiance to the central lord for mutual profit.

===== Relationship of the Srivijaya empire with the Tamil Chola empire =====
Chola Empire also had profound impact on Southeast Asia, who executed South-East Asia campaign of Rajendra Chola I and Chola invasion of Srivijaya.

The relation between Srivijaya and the Chola Empire of south India was friendly during the reign of Raja Raja Chola I but during the reign of Rajendra Chola I the Chola Empire invaded Srivijaya cities. In 1025 and 1026 Gangga Negara was attacked by Rajendra Chola I of the Chola Empire, the Tamil emperor who is now thought to have laid Kota Gelanggi to waste. Kedah—known as Kedaram, Cheh-Cha (according to I-Ching) or Kataha, in ancient Pallava or Sanskrit—was in the direct route of the invasions and was ruled by the Cholas from 1025. A second invasion was led by Virarajendra Chola of the Chola dynasty who conquered Kedah in the late 11th century. The senior Chola's successor, Vira Rajendra Chola, had to put down a Kedah rebellion to overthrow other invaders. The coming of the Chola reduced the majesty of Srivijaya, which had exerted influence over Kedah, Pattani and as far as Ligor. During the reign of Kulothunga Chola I Chola overlordship was established over the Srivijaya province Kedah in the late 11th century. The expedition of the Chola Emperors had such a great impression to the Malay people of the medieval period that their name was mentioned in the corrupted form as Raja Chulan in the medieval Malay chronicle Sejarah Melaya. Even today the Chola rule is remembered in Malaysia as many Malaysian princes have names ending with Cholan or Chulan, one such was the Raja of Perak called Raja Chulan.

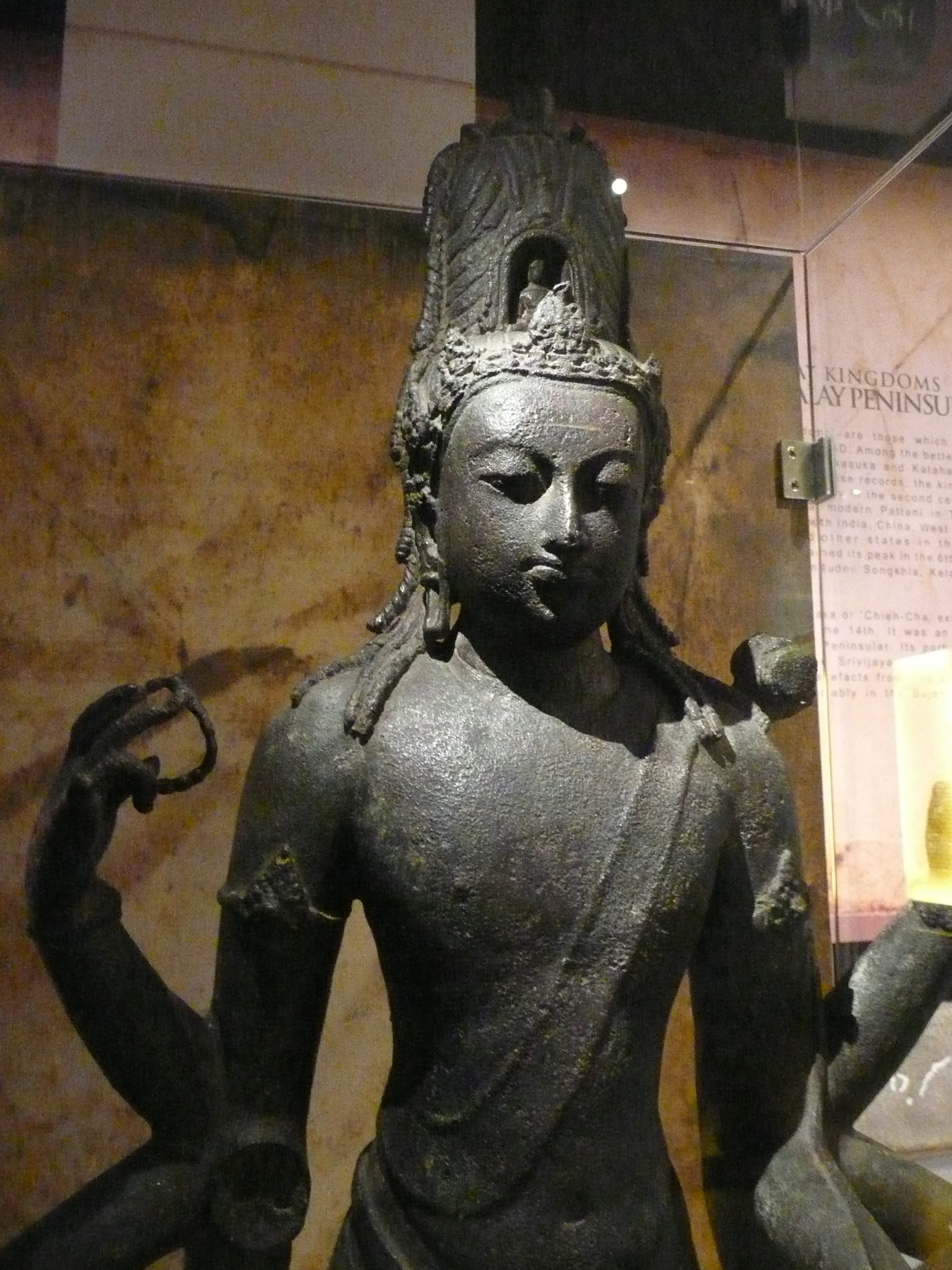
Avalokiteshvara statue found in Perak, 8th–9th century bronze.

Pattinapalai, a Tamil poem of the 2nd century CE, describes goods from Kedaram heaped in the broad streets of the Chola capital. A 7th-century Indian drama, Kaumudhimahotsva, refers to Kedah as Kataha-nagari. The Agnipurana also mentions a territory known as Anda-Kataha with one of its boundaries delineated by a peak, which scholars believe is Gunung Jerai. Stories from the Katasaritasagaram describe the elegance of life in Kataha. The Buddhist kingdom of Ligor took control of Kedah shortly after. Its king Chandrabhanu used it as a base to attack Sri Lanka in the 11th century and ruled the northern parts, an event noted in a stone inscription in Nagapattinum in Tamil Nadu and in the Sri Lankan chronicles, Mahavamsa.

===== Decline of the Srivijaya empire and conflicts between its capital and its former vassal states (12th - 13th century) =====
At times, the Khmer kingdom, the Siamese kingdom, and even the Chola kingdom tried to exert control over the smaller Malay states. The power of Srivijaya declined from the 12th century as the relationship between the capital and its vassal states broke down. Wars with the Javanese caused it to request assistance from China, and it may have also waged wars with the Indian states. In the 11th century, the centre of power shifted to Malayu, a port which was possibly located further up the Sumatran coast near the Jambi River. The power of the Buddhist Maharajas was further undermined by the spread of Islam. Areas which were converted to Islam early, such as Aceh, broke away from Srivijaya's control. By the late 13th century, the Siamese kings of Sukhothai had brought most of Malaya under their rule. In the 14th century, the Hindu Java-based Majapahit empire came into possession of the peninsula.

=== Defeat and conversion to Islamic sultanates in 14th and 15th century ===
In the 14th century that first Islamic sultanate was established. The adoption of Islam in the 14th century saw the rise of a number of sultanates, the most prominent of which was the Sultanate of Malacca. Islam had a profound influence on the Malay people.

=== European colonisation and modern era (16th century - 20th century) ===
The Portuguese were the first European colonial powers to establish themselves on the Malay Peninsula and Southeast Asia, capturing Malacca in 1511, followed by the Dutch in 1641. However, it was the British who, after initially establishing bases at Jesselton, Kuching, Penang and Singapore, ultimately secured their hegemony across the territory that is now Malaysia. The Anglo-Dutch Treaty of 1824 defined the boundaries between British Malaya and the Netherlands East Indies (which became Indonesia). A fourth phase of foreign influence was immigration of Chinese and Indian workers to meet the needs of the colonial economy created by the British in the Malay Peninsula and Borneo.

== Philippines ==
=== Indianised kingdoms in Philippines ===
Locations of pre-colonial principalities, polities, kingdoms and sultanates in the Philippine archipelago

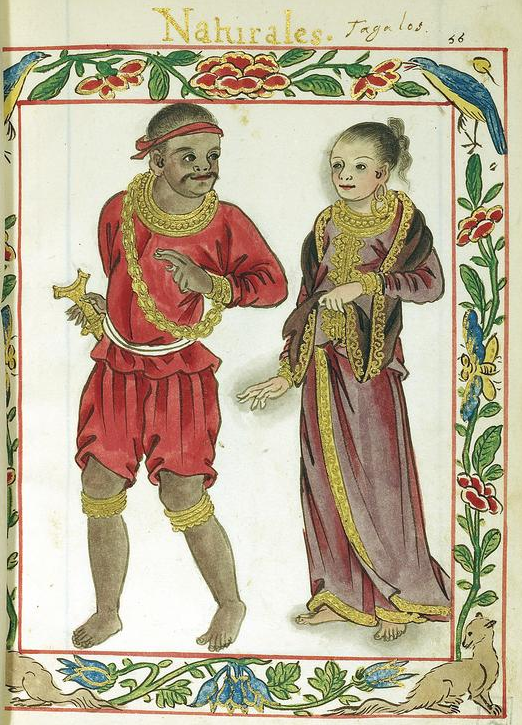
A Tagalog couple of the Maginoo nobility class depicted in the 16th-century Boxer Codex.

  - Luzon
    - Around Manila and Pasig River were 3 polities which were earlier Hindu-Buddhist, later Islamic and then subsumed and converted to Catholicism by Spanish in 16th century
      - Namayan
      - Maynila (historical polity)
        - Rajah Sulayman (also Sulayman III, 1558–1575), Rajah of Maynila
        - Rajah Matanda (1480–1572), ruler of Maynila, together with Rajah Sulayman was co-ruled Maynila, their cousin Lakandula ruled Tondo. Rajah Sulayman was one of three kings that ruled parts of present-day Manila, and fought against the Spanish Empire's colonisation of the Philippines
      - Tondo (historical polity) on the Pasig River in modern-day Metro Manila
        - Lakandula, was a raja who was cousin of Rajah Sulayman and Rajah Matanda
        - Laguna Copperplate Inscription, earliest known written document found in the Philippines, in Indianized Kawi script with Sanskrit loanwords
    - Ma-i, a Hindu-Buddhist kingdom of Mindoro island, from before 10th century till 14th century.
    - Sandao, neighboring vassal-states of Ma-i near Palawan
    - Pulilu, another vassal-state of Ma-i but located in Quezon Province
  - Visayas
    - Cebu at Singhapala (Mabolo in Cebu city on Mahinga creek) capital city in southern Cebu island was a Hindu kingdom founded by Sri Lumay or Rajamuda Lumaya, a half-Malay and half-Tamil from Sumatra. Cebu was subsumed by Spanish in 16th century.
      - King Sri Lumay was half Tamil and half Malay, noted for his strict policies in defending against Moro Muslim raiders and slavers from Mindanao. His use of scorched earth tactics to repel invaders gave rise to the name Kang Sri Lumayang Sugbu (literally "that of Sri Lumay's great fire") to the town, which was later shortened to Sugbu ("scorched earth").
      - Sri Bantug, king and successor son of Sri Lumay
      - Rajah Humabon, king and successor son of Sri Batung
        - Battle of Mactan on 27 April 1521 between Rajah Humabon and Ferdinand Magellan in which Lapulapu fought on side of Rajah, resulting in the death of Ferdinand Magellan.
        - Lapulapu, warrior under Rajah Humabon, Lapulapu fought Spanish
        - Ferdinand Magellan, Portuguese explorer on hired by Spanish empire
      - Rajah Tupas (Sri Tupas), nephew and successor of Rajah Humabon, last to rule the kingdom before subsumed by Spanish Miguel López de Legazpi in the battle of Cebu during 1565.
      - Caste system: Below the rulers were the Timawa, the feudal warrior class of the ancient Visayan societies of the Philippines who were regarded as higher than the uripon (commoners, serfs, and slaves) but below the Tumao (royal nobility) in the Visayan social hierarchy. They were roughly similar to the Tagalog maharlika caste. Lapu Lapu was a Timawa.
      - A crude Buddhist medallion and a copper statue of a Hindu Deity, Ganesha, has been found by Henry Otley Beyer in 1921 in ancient sites in Puerto Princesa, Palawan and in Mactan, Cebu. The crudeness of the artifacts indicates they are of local reproduction. Unfortunately, these icons were destroyed during World War II. However, black and white photographs of these icons survive.
    - Madja-as of Panay island was a supra-baranganic polity from 14th century till 16th century until subsumed by Spanish.
  - Mindanao
    - Butuan in northeast Mindanao, a Hindu kingdom that existed earlier than the 10th century. According to researcher Eric Casino, its first King who was named Rajah Kiling was not a native Filipino and was in fact from India as Kiling is the local term for Indians. In nearby Malaysia the similarly worded Keling means an immigrant from India. Butuan flourished until being subsumed by the Spanish in 16th century
    - Sanmalan in the Zamboanga Peninsula
      - Mount Diwata: named after diwata concept of Philippines based on the devata deity concept of Hinduism
    - Kingdom of Kumalarang in Kumalarang, Zamboanga del Sur
    - Confederate States of Lanao of Muslims in Maguindanao in northwestern Mindanao from 15th century till the present day.
    - Sultanate of Maguindanao in Cotabato in far west Mindanao from split from Srivijaya Hindu ancestors in 16th century and ruled till early 20th century, originally converted by sultan of Johor in 16th century but maintained informal kinship with Hindu siblings who are now likely Christians
    - Sultanate of Sulu in southwestern Mindanao, established in 1457 by a Johore-born Muslim explorer, gained independence from the Bruneian Empire in 1578 and lasted till 1986. It also covered the area in northeastern side of Borneo, stretching from Marudu Bay to Tepian Durian in present-day Kalimantan.
    - Lupah Sug, a predecessor Hindu state before the establishment of Sultanate of Sulu.
      - Maimbung principality: Hindu polity, predecessor of Lupah Sug Muslim sultanate. Sulu that time was called Lupah Sug The Principality of Maimbung, populated by Buranun people (or Budanon, literally means "mountain-dwellers"), was first ruled by a certain rajah who assumed the title Rajah Sipad the Older. According to Majul, the origins of the title rajah sipad originated from the Hindu sri pada, which symbolises authority. The Principality was instituted and governed using the system of rajahs. Sipad the Older was succeeded by Sipad the Younger.

=== Indians in Philippines during colonial era ===
- 1762–1764 British Manila
  - Battle of Manila (1762) by the East India Company's Indian soldiers during Anglo-Spanish War (1762–1763)
  - Cainta in Rizal: historic colonial era settlement of escaped Indians sepoys of British East India Company
- Indian Filipino: Filipino citizens with part or whole Indian blood

=== Key Indianised Hindu-Buddhist artifacts found in Philippines ===
- Luzon
  - Laguna Copperplate Inscription in Luzon, earliest known written document found in the Philippines, in Indianized Kawi script with Sanskrit loanwords
  - Palawan Tabon Caves Garuda Gold Pendant found in the Tabon caves in the island of Palawan, is an image of Garuda, the eagle bird who is the mount of Hindu deity Vishnu
- Visayas
  - Rajahnate of Cebu Buddhist medallion and copper statue of Hindu Deity: A crude Buddhist medallion and a copper statue of a Hindu Deity, Ganesha, has been found by Henry Otley Beyer in 1921 in ancient sites in Puerto Princesa, Palawan and in Mactan, Cebu. The crudeness of the artifacts indicates they are of local reproduction. Unfortunately, these icons were destroyed during World War II. However, black and white photographs of these icons survive.
- Mindanao
  - Golden Tara (Agusan image) from Kingdom of Butuan in northeast Mindanao is a golden statue that was found in Agusan del Sur in northeast Mindanao.

== Singapore ==
The Greco-Roman astronomer Ptolemy (90–168) identified a place called Sabana at the tip of Golden Chersonese (believed to be the Malay Peninsula) in the second and third century. The earliest written record of Singapore may be in a Chinese account from the third century, describing the island of Pu Luo Chung (蒲 羅 中). This is thought to be a transcription from the Malay name "Pulau Ujong", or "island at the end" (of the Malay Peninsula).

In 1025 CE, Rajendra Chola I of the Chola Empire led forces across the Indian Ocean and invaded the Srivijayan empire, attacking several places in Malaysia and Indonesia. The Chola forces were said to have controlled Temasek (now Singapore) for a couple of decades. The name Temasek however did not appear in Chola records, but a tale involving a Raja Chulan (assumed to be Rajendra Chola) and Temasek was mentioned in the semi-historical Malay Annals.

The Nagarakretagama, a Javanese eulogy written in 1365, referred to a settlement on the island called Tumasik (possibly meaning "Sea Town" or "Sea Port").

=== Hindu-Buddhist kingdom (? - ~1511) ===
The name Temasek is also given in Sejarah Melayu (Malay Annals), which contains a tale of the founding of Temasek by a prince of Srivijaya, Sri Tri Buana (also known as Sang Nila Utama) in the 13th century. Sri Tri Buana landed on Temasek on a hunting trip, and saw a strange beast said to be a lion. The prince took this as an auspicious sign and founded a settlement called Singapura, which means "Lion City" in Sanskrit. The actual origin of the name Singapura however is unclear according to scholars.

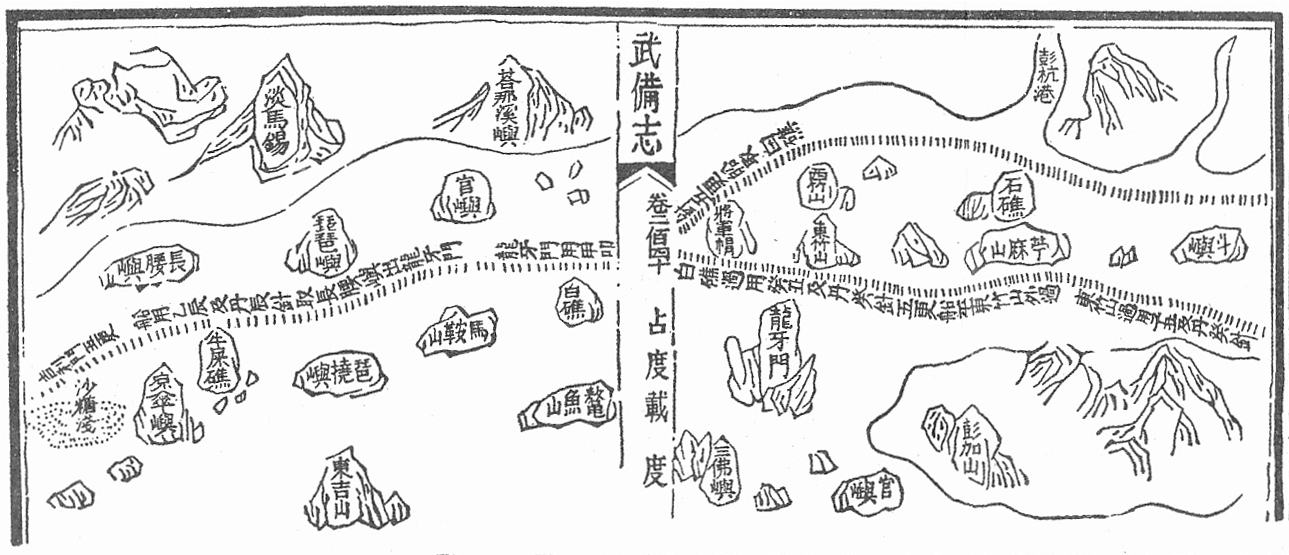
The Mao Kun map from Wubei Zhi which is based on the early 15th century maps of Zheng He showing Temasek (淡馬錫) at the top left, and Long Ya Men (龍牙門) on the right panel.

In 1320, the Mongol Empire sent a trade mission to a place called Long Ya Men (or Dragon's Teeth Gate), which is believed to be Keppel Harbour at the southern part of the island. The Chinese traveller Wang Dayuan, visiting the island around 1330, described Long Ya Men as one of the two distinct settlements in Dan Ma Xi (from Malay Temasek), the other being Ban Zu (from Malay pancur). Ban Zu is thought to be present day Fort Canning Hill, and recent excavations in Fort Canning found evidence indicating that Singapore was an important settlement in the 14th century. Wang mentioned that the natives of Long Ya Men (thought to be the Orang Laut) and Chinese residents lived together in Long Ya Men. Singapore is one of the oldest locations where a Chinese community is known to exist outside China, and the oldest corroborated by archaeological evidence.

Sometime in its history, the name of Temasek was changed to Singapura. The Sejarah Melayu (Malay Annals) contains a tale of a prince of Srivijaya, Sri Tri Buana (also known as Sang Nila Utama), who landed on Temasek after surviving a storm in the 13th century. According to the tale, the prince saw a strange creature, which he was told was a lion; believing this to be an auspicious sign, he decided to found a settlement called Singapura, which means "Lion City" in Sanskrit. It is unlikely there ever were lions in Singapore, though tigers continued to roam the island until the early 20th century. However, the lion motif is common in Hindu mythology, which was dominant in the region during that period (one of the words for "throne" in the Malay language is "singgasana", meaning "lion's seat" in Sanskrit), and it has been speculated that the "Singapura" name, and the tale of the lion, were invented by court historians of the Malacca Sultanate to glorify Sang Nila Utama and his line of descent.

Different versions of its history are told in Portuguese sources, suggesting that Temasek was a Siamese vassal whose ruler was killed by Parameswara from Palembang. Historians believe that during the late 14th century, Parameswara, the last Srivijayan prince, fled to Temasek from Palembang after being deposed by the Majapahit Empire. According to Portuguese accounts, Parameswara killed the local chief with the title Sang Aji eight days after being welcomed into Temasek.

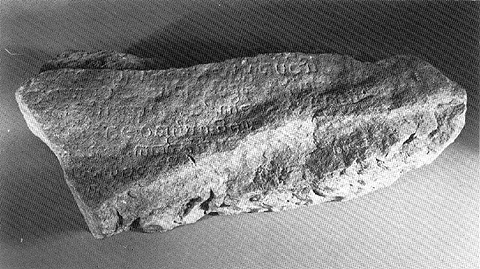
A fragment of the Singapore Stone, inscribed with an Indic script, c. 10th to 13th century.

By the 14th century, the empire of Srivijaya had already declined, and Singapore was caught in the struggle between Siam (now Thailand) and the Java-based Majapahit Empire for control over the Malay Peninsula. According to the Malay Annals, Singapore was defeated in one Majapahit attack. The last king, Sultan Iskandar Shah (a prince of Srivijaya empire, his Hindu name Parameswara before he was converted to Islam) ruled the island for several years, before being forced to Melaka where he founded the Sultanate of Malacca. Portuguese sources however indicated that Temasek was a Siamese vassal whose ruler was killed by Parameswara (thought to be the same person as Sultan Iskandar Shah) from Palembang, and Parameswara was then driven to Malacca, either by the Siamese or the Majapahit, where he founded the Malacca Sultanate. Modern archaeological evidence suggests that the settlement on Fort Canning was abandoned around this time, although a small trading settlement continued in Singapore for some time afterwards.

=== Islamic sultanate (1511 - 1613) ===
The Malacca Sultanate extended its authority over the island and Singapore became a part of the Malacca Sultanate. However, by the time the Portuguese arrived in the early 16th century, Singapura had already become "great ruins" according to Alfonso de Albuquerque. In 1511, the Portuguese seized Malacca; the sultan of Malacca escaped south and established the Johor Sultanate, and Singapore then became part of the sultanate which was destroyed in 1613.

=== British colony and modern era (19th century - present) ===
The Portuguese however destroyed the settlement in Singapore in 1613, and the island sank into obscurity for the next two centuries.

== Thailand ==
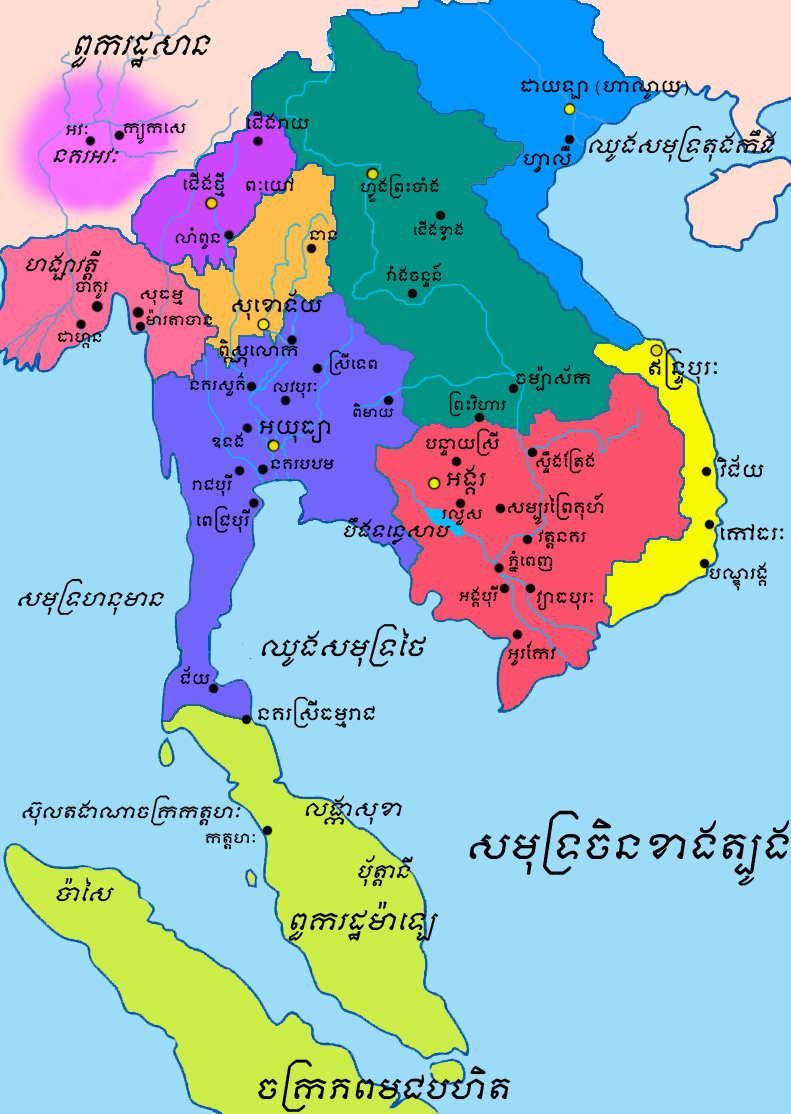
Map of Southeast Asia c. 900CE, showing the Khmer Empire in red and Haripunjaya in light green

=== Propagation of Buddhism in Thailand by emperor Ashoka (3rd century BCE) ===
Historically, the cultural and economic interaction between the two countries can be traced to roughly around the 6th century B.C. The single most significant cultural contribution of India, for which Thailand is greatly indebted to India, is Buddhism. Propagated in Thailand in the 3rd century B.C. by Buddhist monks sent by King Asoka, it was adopted as the state religion of Thailand and has ruled the hearts and minds of Thais ever since. Presently 58,000,000 Thais, an overwhelming 94% of the total Thai populace adheres to Buddhism. However, direct contact can be said to have begun only in the 3rd century B.C. when King Asoka sent Buddhist monks to propagate Buddhism in the Indo-Chinese Peninsula. Besides Buddhism, Thailand has also adopted other typically Indian religious and cultural traditions. The ceremonies and rites especially as regards the Monarchy evidence a strong Hindu influence.

=== Sukhothai period: Settlement of Indian traders and Brahmins in Thailand (1275–1350) ===
The Indians who moved into Thailand in the Sukhothai period (1275–1350) were either merchants who came to Siam or Thailand, for the purpose of trading or Brahmans who played an important role in the Siamese court as experts in astrology and in conducting ceremonies. The first group of Brahmans who entered Siam before the founding of Sukhothai as the first capital of Siam (1275–1350) popularized Hindu beliefs and traditions. During the Sukhothai period Brahman temples already existed. Brahmans conducted ceremonies in the court. The concepts of divine kingship and royal ceremonies are clear examples of the influence of Brahmanism.

The Coronation of the Thai monarch are practiced more or less in its original form even up to the present reign. The Thai idea that the king is a reincarnation of the Hindu deity Vishnu was adopted from Indian tradition. (Though this belief no longer exists today, the tradition to call each Thai king of the present Chakri dynasty Rama (Rama is an incarnation of Vishnu) with an ordinal number, such as Rama I, Rama II etc. is still in practice.)

=== Ayutthaya period: Settlement of more Indian Tamil traders in Thailand (1350–1767 CE) ===
In the Ayutthaya kingdom era (1350–1767), more Tamil merchants entered the South of the country by boat as evidenced by the statues of Hindu gods excavated in the South.

=== Later migration of Indians to Thailand (1855 CE - present day) ===
After the year 1855, the Tamils who migrated to Thailand can be classified into three groups according to the religion they believed in, namely, Hinduism, Buddhism, and Islam.

=== Indian cultural influence on Thailand ===
==== Dance ====
Thai literature and drama draws great inspiration from Indian arts and legend. The Hindu epic of Ramayana is as popular in Thailand as it is in India. Thailand has adapted the Ramayana to suit the Thai lifestyle in the past and has come up with its own version of the Ramayana, namely, the Ramakien.

Two of the most popular classical dances the Khon, performed by men wearing ferocious masks, and the Lakhon (Lakhon nai, Lakhon chatri and Lakhon nok), performed by women who play both male and female roles draws inspiration primarily from the Ramakien. Percussion instruments and Piphat, a type of woodwind accompany the dance.

In addition, there are shadow play called nang talung in Thai. This is a show in which shadows of pieces of cow or water buffalo hide cut to represent human figures with movable arms and legs are thrown on a screen for the entertainment of spectators. In South India, this kind of show is called Bommalattam.

==== Language ====
Thai language too bears close affinity with Sanskrit and Dravidian languages. An indication of the close linguistic affiliation between India and Thailand is found in common Thai words like Ratha Mantri, Vidhya, Samuthra, Karuna, Gulab, Prannee etc. which are almost identical to their Indian counterparts. Thai language basically consists of monosyllabic words that are individually complete in meaning. His Majesty King Ram Khamhaeng the Great created the Thai alphabet in 1283. He modeled it on the ancient Indian alphabets of Sanskrit and Pali through the medium of the old Khmer characters. Like most world languages, the Thai language is a complicated mixture derived from several sources. Many Thai words used today were derived from Pali, Sanskrit, Khmer, Malay, English and Chinese.

==== Religious ceremonies and festivals ====
Several Thai ceremonies have been adopted from Indian tradition. These include ceremonies related to ordination, marriage, merit making and cremation. Though the Buddha is the prime inspiration of Thailand, Brahma and other Hindu deities are widely worshipped among the Thais, due in part to the popularity of the Hindu ceremonial rites, which are used especially for royal ceremonies.

(1) The Triyampawai Ceremony or the Giant Swing Ceremony. Originally a Brahmin ceremony performed to pay homage to the God Shiva, it was traditionally held front of Wat Suthat, while the King and Queen watched the ceremony from a gold silk pavilion. Though the ceremony was abolished during the reign of King Rama VII due to a severe economic fall, Brahman priests are still allocated money to make offerings to God Shiva.

(2) The Royal Ploughing Ceremony, which is officiated by H.M. the king at Sanam Luang in May every year with pomp. Originally a Brahmanic rite, it was adopted to mark the beginning of the farming season as also to bless all farmers with fertility for the year.

(3) The Royal Ceremony for preparing Celestial Rice or Khao thip which was said to be originally prepared by celestial beings in honor of God Indra. A portion of the celestial rice is offered to monks while the remainder was divided in varying quantities among the royal family, courtiers and household members. The making of the ambrosial dish has come to a natural end since custom demanded that virgins alone should perform the preparation and stirring of celestial rice.

(4) The Kathina Ceremony or the period during which Buddhist monks receive new robes, which generally falls in the months of October- November.

(5) Loy Krathong – the Festival of Lights which is celebrated on the full moon night of the twelfth lunar month. The floating of Loi Krathong lanterns, which began in the Sukhothai Kingdom period, continued throughout the different stages of Thai history. The present day understanding is that the festival is celebrated as an act of worship to Chao Mae Kangka, the Goddess of the Waters, for providing the water much needed throughout the year, and as a way of asking forgiveness if they have polluted it or used it carelessly.

(6) Songkran Festival: Songkran day marks Thai New Year day. "Songkran" signifies the sun's move into the first house of the zodiac. It is similar to Indian Holi and Makar Sankranti.

(7) Visakha Puja Day which is considered as the greatest Buddhist holy day as it commemorates the birth, enlightenment and death of the Buddha.

Other famous ceremonial holy days include Magha Puja day, in February and Asalha Puja day in July which commemorates the day on which the Buddha delivered the First Sermon to his five disciples, namely, Konthanya, Vassapa, Bhattiya, Mahanama and Assashi at Esipatanamaruekathayawan (Isipatana forest at Sarnath in India) and there explained his concept of the Four Noble Truths (Ariyasai).

==== Hindu astrology ====
Hindu astrology still has a great impact on several important stages of Thai life. Thai people still seek advice from knowledgeable Buddhist monks or Brahman astrologers about the auspicious or inauspicious days for conducting or abstaining from ceremonies for moving house or getting married.

==== Influence of Ayurveda on Thai traditional medicine and massage ====
According to the Thai monk Venerable Buddhadasa Bhikku's writing, 'India's Benevolence to Thailand', the Thais also obtained the methods of making herbal medicines (Ayurveda) from the Indians. Some plants like sarabhi of family Guttiferae, kanika or harsinghar, phikun or Mimusops elengi and bunnak or the rose chestnut etc. were brought from India.

==== Influence of Indian cuisine and spices on Thai cuisine ====
Thai monk Buddhadasa Bhikku's pointed out that Thai cuisine too was influenced by Indian cuisine. He wrote that Thai people learned how to use spices in their food in various ways from Indians.

== Vietnam ==
=== Early Chinese vassal states ===
At the eastern extremity of mainland Southeast Asia, northern Vietnam was originally occupied by Austro-Asiatic peoples. However, when regional power structures shifted Kra-Dai speaking tribes from Southern China began to settle in these lands. About 207 BC, Triệu Đà, a Qin general, taking advantage of the temporary fragmentation of the Chinese Empire on the collapse of the Qin dynasty, created in northern Vietnam the kingdom of Nanyue. During the 1st century BC, Nanyue was incorporated in the Chinese Empire of the Han dynasty; and it remained a province of the empire until the fall of the Tang dynasty early in the 10th century. It then regained its independence, often as a nominal tributary kingdom of the Chinese emperor.

=== Establishment of Indianised Hindu kingdom of Champa (10th century -) ===
In south-central Vietnam the Chams, a people of Austronesian stock, established the Hinduised kingdom of Champa c. 400. Subject to periodic invasions by the Annamese and by the Khmers of Cambodia, Champa survived and prospered. In 1471, a Vietnamese army of approximately 260,000, invaded Champa under Emperor Lê Thánh Tông (黎聖宗). The invasion began as a consequence of Cham King's Trà Toàn attack on Vietnam in 1470. The Vietnamese committed genocide against the Cham slaughtering approximately 60,000. The Vietnamese destroyed, burnt and raided massive parts of Champa, seizing the entire kingdom. Thousands of Cham escaped to Cambodia, the remaining were forced to assimilate into Vietnamese culture. Today, only 80,000 Cham remain in Vietnam.

=== Influence of Indian-origin Buddhism on Vietnam via Chinese culture ===
Vietnam, or then known as Annam (安南; pinyin: Ānnán), experienced little Hindu influence – usually via Champa. Unlike other Southeast Asian countries (except for Singapore and the Philippines), Vietnam was influenced by the Indian-origin religion Buddhism via the strong impact of culture of China.

== See also ==
- Spread of Indian influence
  - Greater India
  - Indosphere
  - Buddhism in Southeast Asia
  - Hinduism in Southeast Asia
  - Indianization of Southeast Asia
- Trading routes
  - Indian maritime history
  - Silk Road
  - Ancient maritime history
- Other related
  - List of Southeast Asian leaders
  - Southeast Asian Games
  - Southeast Asia Treaty Organization
  - Tiger Cub Economies
