= Samara Vijayatunggavarman =

Samara Vijayatunggavarman was the Maharaja of Srivijaya from 1045 CE.

== Evidence ==
Srivijaya was thought to be destroyed by Chola during the attack in 1025. But in 1966 a Sri Lanka archaeologist named Senarath Paranavithana discovered two inscriptions; the Madigiriya inscription and Bolanda inscription.

=== Madigiriya inscription ===
This inscription was written during the short reign of Mahinda VI.

(This inscription) was formulated in memory of Maharaja Samara who drove Chola out of all Sri Lanka. The village of Mehendibapiti, which is owned by Maharaja Samara, should be given to the tenant, it should be remembered at this time; We have been released by this king, he must be remembered, our villages and lands have been released by this king, it must also be remembered that no matter how many villages he owns, how many houses and gardens he owns, the houses and the gardens would remain uninhabited without any court officials invading their rights and plundering them.

=== Bolanda inscription ===
This inscription wrote about the story of Adipada Mahendra who had been defeated in a battle. He fled his land and gained protection at Srivijaya which was ruled by Maravijayottungavarman at that time. Adipada Mahendra had a son named Mahendra and a princess who married Maravijayottungavarman. From the marriage, the Maharaja had two children, Sangrama Vijayatunggavarman and Samara Vijayatunggavarman. Mahendra later married with Samara's princess. The inscription also wrote about Rajendra Chola I's murder.

== History ==
Rajendra Chola I launched an attack on Srivijaya and captured Maharaja Sangrama Vijayatunggavarman in 1025. Sri Deva took the leadership of Srivijaya from Palembang and restored balance in the government.

According to a theory proposed by Puranavitana, in 1044, Rajendra Chola I was supposedly assassinated when he visited Srivijaya by a Srivijayan prince called Purendara as per the orders of Samara. On the contrary, according to South Indian epigraphs and records, Rajendra Chola I died in Brahmadesam now a part of North Arcot district in Tamil Nadu, India. This information is recorded in an inscription of his son, Rajadhiraja Chola I which states that Rajendra Chola's queen Viramadeviyar committed Sati upon Rajendra's death and her remains were interred in the same tomb as Rajendra Chola I in Brahmadesam. It adds that the queen's brother who was a general in Rajendra's army set up a watershed at the same place in memory of his sister.

== Bibliography ==
- S. Paranavitana (1966) "Ceylon and Śrī Vijaya, in Artibus Asiae. Supplementum, Vol. 23, Essays Offered to G.H. Luce by His Colleagues and Friends in Honour of His Seventy-Fifth Birthday. Volume 1:Papers on Asian History, Religion, Languages, Literature, Music Folkfore and Anthropology" Artibus Asiae Publishers
