= Sri Deva =

King of Srivijava of Sailendra dynasty

Sri Deva was a king of Srivijaya Kingdom of Sailendra dynasty, who in 1028 CE sent an envoy to the Chinese Northern Song dynasty. In the chronicle History of Song (Sòng Shǐ), his name was recorded as Shih-li Tieh-hua, which may not be his complete title. He ruled shortly after Srivijaya's various territories were attacked by King Rajendra I of the Chola dynasty in 1025 CE, in which King Sangramavijayottunggawarman of Srivijaya was defeated and captured by his opponent. Chola attack was not accompanied by the occupation of the Srivijaya territories.

After the attack, Srivijaya's power in Sumatra seemed to be restored, however it made peace with the Kahuripan Kingdom, which claimed power over the whole of Java. The Kahuripan king Airlangga supposedly married a Srivijayan princess in 1030 CE to strengthen the peace commitment.

Mahayana Buddhism teaching was very popular in Srivijaya around the time of Sri Deva's reign, as evidenced by the discovery of the Lokanatha (Lokesvara Bodhisattva) statue in Tapanuli which was made in 1024 CE, and from the notes of Nepalese monk Atiśa who visited Srivijaya between 1011 and 1023 CE.

== See also ==
- Chola invasion of Srivijaya
