= Cudamani Warmadewa =

- Chulâ-manivarmmanah; Shi-li-zhu-luo-wu-ni-fo-ma-tiao-hua

Maharaja of Srivijaya
- Reign: 988–1008
- Predecessor: Udayaditya Warmadewa
- Successor: Maravijayottunggavarman
- House: Shailendra
- Religion: Buddha

Sri Cudamani Warmadewa or Sri Cudamani Varmadeva or written as Shi-li-zhu-luo-wu-ni-fo-ma-tiao-hua (Chinese transcription), was an emperor of Srivijaya which belongs to the Sailendra dynasty, who reigned in Kedah in the late 10th century CE (circa 988 to 1004). He was known as an able and astute ruler, a clever tactician with shrewd diplomatic skills. His reign was quite renowned since during his period, the kingdom faced a dire crisis; the naval invasion of Javanese Mataram kingdom. He was the nemesis of King Dharmawangsa of Java.

== Javanese invasion ==
In 990 CE, King Dharmawangsa of Java launched a naval invasion against Srivijaya and attempted to capture the capital Kedah. The news of Javanese invasion of Srivijaya was recorded in Chinese sources from Song period. In 988, a Srivijayan envoy was sent to Chinese court in Guangzhou. After sojourned for about two years in China, the envoy learned that his country has been attacked by She-po (Java) thus made him unable to return home. In 992 the envoy from She-po (Java) arrived in Chinese court and explaining that their country has involved in continuous war with San-fo-qi (Srivijaya). In 999 the Srivijayan envoy sailed from China to Champa in an attempt to return home, however he received no news about the condition of his country. The Srivijayan envoy then sailed back to China and appealed Chinese Emperor for the protection of China against Javanese invaders.

Dharmawangsa's invasion led Cudamani Warmadewa to seek protection from China. In the midst of crisis brought by Javanese invasion, he secured Chinese political support by appeasing the Chinese Emperor. In 1003, a Song historical record reported that the envoy of San-fo-qi was dispatched by the king Shi-li-zhu-luo-wu-ni-fo-ma-tiao-hua (Sri Cudamani Warmadewa). The Srivijayan envoy told Chinese court that in their country a Buddhist temple had been erected to pray for the long life of Chinese Emperor, thus asked the emperor to give the name and the bell for this temple which was built in his honor. Rejoiced, the Chinese Emperor named the temple Ch'eng-t'en-wan-shou ('ten thousand years of receiving blessing from heaven, which is China) and a bell was immediately cast and sent to Srivijaya to be installed in the temple.

By 1005, Srivijaya started to appear victoriously. In 1006 CE, Srivijaya's alliance proved its resilience by successfully repelling the Javanese invasion, subsequently the Javanese invasion was ultimately unsuccessful. This attack has opened the eyes of Srivijayan Maharaja of how dangerous Javanese Mataram Kingdom could be, and further contemplate, patiently laid a plan and effort to destroy his Javanese nemesis. King Cudamani died circa 1008, He was succeeded by his heir, Sri Maravijayottungavarman.

== Retaliation ==
The retaliation was probably carried out by Cudamani's successor, Sri Maravijayottungavarman. In 1016, Srivijaya assisted Haji (king) Wurawari of Lwaram to revolt, which led to the attack and destruction of the Mataram palace. This sudden and unexpected attack took place during the wedding ceremony of Dharmawangsa's daughter, which rendered the court unprepared and shocked. With the death of Dharmawangsa and the fall of the Mataram capital, Srivijaya contributed to the collapse of Mataram kingdom, leaving Eastern Java in further unrest, violence and, ultimately, desolation for several years to come.
