= Sangrama Vijayottunggavarman =

Sangrama Vijayottunggavarman (spelled alternatively as Sangramavijayottunggavarman or Sang Rama Wijaya Tungga Warman) was an emperor of Srivijaya of Sailendra dynasty, who reigned in the early 11th century in Kadaram and succeeded Mara Vijayottunggavarman. He is best known for being captured by the Chola Navy following the Chola invasion of Srivijaya.

The name of the emperor was inscribed on an inscription dated 1030 CE in Rajarajeshwaram Temple, Tanjore. The inscription was made during the reign of Rajendra Chola I, to commemorate his military campaign against Srivijaya that was launched in 1025. The inscription states that the Cholas successfully sacked Kadaram and took a large amount of treasures, including the Vidhyadara-torana, the jewelled 'war gate' of Srivijaya adorned with great splendour. During the raid of Kadaram, Vijayatunggavarman was captured.

== See also ==
- Greater India
- Hinduism in Indonesia
- History of Indian influence on Southeast Asia
