= Chudamani Vihara =

Buddhist monastery in Tamil Nadu, India

Chudamani Vihara was a Buddhist vihara (monastery) in Nagapattinam, Tamil Nadu, India. Chudamani Vihara was constructed in 1006 CE by the Srivijayan king Sri Vijaya Maravijayattungavarman with the patronage of Rajaraja Chola I. The vihara building survived in dilapidated condition. Since 1856, about 350 Buddha bronzes have been found at Nagapattinam, dating from the 11th to the 16th century.

== History ==
According to the copperplate record of Chola king Rajaraja, the Sailendra king, Sri Mara-vijayottunga-varman constructed the vihara with the support of Rajaraja. These copperplates were part of the collection of Leiden University (Holland) until 2026, when they were restituted to India.

One statue, now at John D. Rockefeller Collection of Asian Art in New York, has an inscription that mentions that this Buddha was created to be carried in a procession during the temple’s sacred festival. The inscription has been translated by Vidya Dehejia as:

Well-being [and] prosperity. The nayakar [Buddha], of all of the eighteen countries, of the metalworkers. The procession image, for the sacred festival of the alvar temple, which was caused to be taken in procession by the respected one (utaiyar) endowed of the four gunas from Cirutavur; [in] the perum-palli (great place of worship or great vihara) of the metalworkers, [in] the perum-palli of Rajendra Chola.
