= Mandala (political model) =

Southeast Asian pseudo-feudalistic political model between 5th and 15th century

Notable mandalas in classical Southeast Asian history (c. 5th to 15th century). From north to south; Bagan, Ayutthaya, Champa, Angkor, Srivijaya and Majapahit.

In the historiography of premodern Southeast Asia, a mandala (Sanskrit: मण्डल, romanized: maṇḍala, lit. 'circle') is a pattern of political organization characterized by overlapping spheres of influence rather than fixed territorial boundaries. Mandala relationships were based primarily on personal ties between an overlord and subordinate rulers. Tributaries could be required to provide tribute, men, and supplies in exchange for protection and reciprocal gifts, while generally retaining control over their own internal affairs. These relationships varied in strength and were not necessarily exclusive: a ruler could acknowledge more than one stronger power.

Among the polities associated with the mandala model are the Khmer Empire, Srivijaya, the Javanese kingdoms of Mataram, Kediri, Singhasari, and Majapahit, the Ayutthaya Kingdom, Champa, early Đại Việt, Lan Xang, and Lanna. European colonization in the 19th century introduced fixed territorial boundaries and more exclusive forms of sovereignty, displacing the mandala system in much of the region.

The name mandala draws an analogy with the mandala of Hindu and Buddhist cosmology; similar political patterns have also been described using the "galactic polity" and "solar polity" metaphors.

== Terminology ==
The term mandala draws a comparison with the mandala of the Hindu and Buddhist cosmologies; the comparison emphasises the radiation of power from each power centre, as well as the non-physical basis of the system.

Other metaphors such as the anthropologist S. J. Tambiah's original idea of a "galactic polity" describe political patterns similar to those of mandalas. The historian Victor Lieberman prefers the "solar polity" metaphor, referencing the gravitational pull the sun exerts over the planets.

== History ==
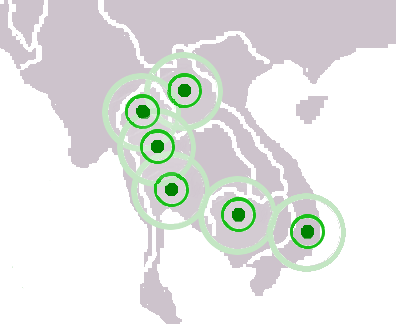
Intersecting mandalas c. 1360: from north to south: Lan Xang, Lanna, Sukhothai, Ayutthaya, Khmer and Champa.

These dynamic systems could maintain a symbolic "centre of domination". The centre was often embodied by a ruler's court or sacred site.

Historically, the main suzerain (or overlord) states were the Khmer Empire; Srivijaya of South Sumatra; the successive kingdoms of Mataram, Kediri, Singhasari and Majapahit of Java; the Ayutthaya Kingdom; Champa and early Đại Việt. China occupies a special place in that its neighbours often in turn paid tribute to China, although in practice obligations imposed on lesser kingdoms were minimal. The most notable tributary states were post-Angkor Cambodia, Lan Xang (succeeded by the Kingdom of Vientiane and Luang Prabang), and Lanna. Cambodia in the 18th century was described by the Vietnamese emperor Gia Long as "an independent country that is slave of two" (Chandler p. 119). The system was ended by the arrival of the Europeans in the mid-19th century, who imposed the concept of an area being subject to only one sovereign. The colonisation of French Indochina, Dutch East Indies, British Malaya and Burma introduced fixed boundaries between their possessions. The original states were divided between the European colonies and Siam (which exercised more centralised power over a smaller area).

The arrival of Islam to the archipelago saw the application of this system which is still continued in the formation of the government, such as the formation of the 18th century Negeri Sembilan coalition which focused on Seri Menanti as a centre flanked by four inner luak serambi and four outer districts. Another example is the post-Majapahit Islamic kingdoms in Java.

The mandala model contrasts with modern centralized states, a distinction some scholars attribute partly to premodern Southeast Asia's lack of precise cartography, which later technologies and colonial practices emphasized. O. W. Wolters, who further developed the mandala concept, described the system as:

The map of earlier Southeast Asia [...] was a patchwork of often overlapping mandalas.

Historian Martin Stuart-Fox uses the term "mandala" extensively to describe the history of the Lao kingdom of Lan Xang as a structure of loosely held together mueang that disintegrated after Lan Xang's conquest by Thailand starting in the 18th century.

Thai historian Sunait Chutintaranond made an important contribution to study of the mandala in Southeast Asian history by demonstrating that "three assumptions responsible for the view that Ayudhya was a strong centralized state" did not hold and that "in Ayudhya the hegemony of provincial governors was never successfully eliminated."

== Obligations ==
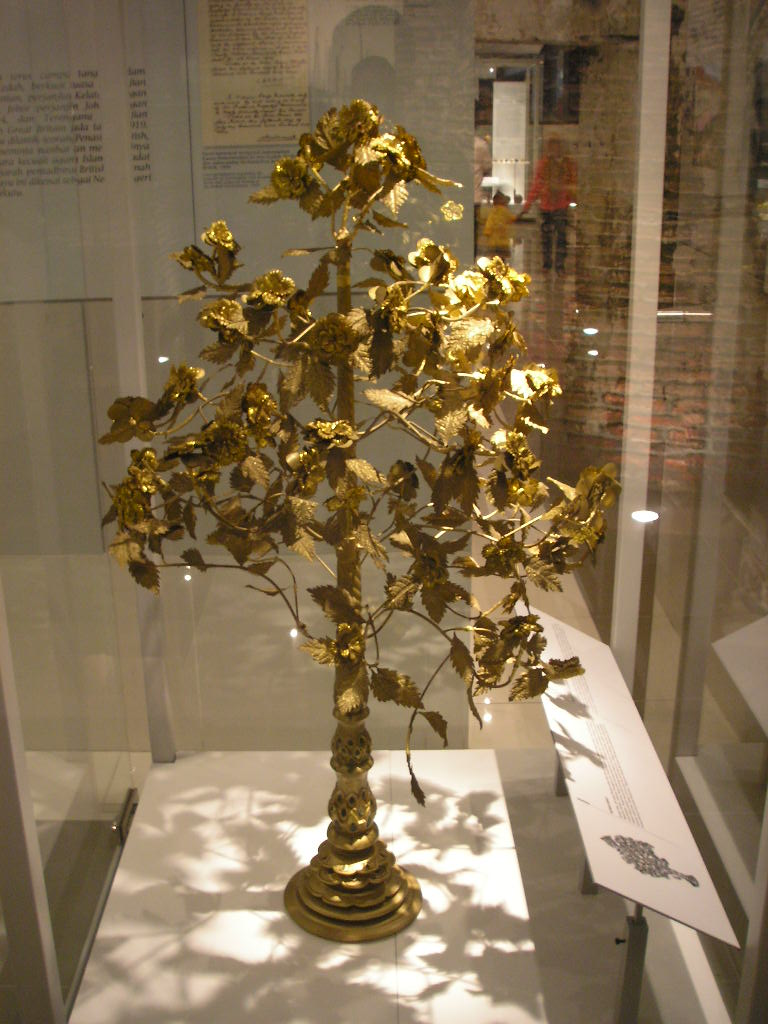
Bunga mas (Flowers of Gold), tribute from northern Malay states in Malay peninsula for Siam. National Museum, Kuala Lumpur.)

The obligations on each side of the relationship varied according to the strength of the relationship and the circumstances. In general, the tributary was obliged to pay bunga mas, a regular tribute of various valuable goods and slaves, and miniature trees of gold and silver (bunga mas dan perak). The overlord ruler reciprocated with presents often of greater value than those supplied by the tributary. However, the tributary also had to provide men and supplies when called on, most often in time of war. The main benefit to the tributary was protection from invasion by other powers, although as South East Asia historian Thongchai Winichakul notes, this was often "mafia-like protection" from the threats of the overlord himself. In some cases, the overlord also controlled the succession in the tributary, but in general, interference with the tributary's domestic affairs was minimal: he would retain his own army and powers of taxation, for example. In the case of the more tenuous relationships, the "overlord" might regard it as one of tribute, while the "tributary" might consider the exchange of gifts to be purely commercial or as an expression of goodwill.

== Personal relationships ==
The emphasis on personal relationships was one of the defining characteristics of the mandala system. The tributary ruler was subordinate to the overlord ruler, rather than to the overlord state in the abstract. This had many important implications. A strong ruler could attract new tributaries, and would have strong relationships over his existing tributaries. A weaker ruler would find it harder to attract and maintain these relationships. This was put forward as one cause of the sudden rise of Sukhothai under Ramkhamhaeng, for example, and for its almost equally steep decline after his death (Wyatt, 45 and 48). The tributary ruler could repudiate the relationship and seek either a different overlord or complete independence. The system was non-territorial. The overlord was owed allegiance by the tributary ruler, or at most by the tributary's main town, but not by all the people of a particular area. The tributary owner in turn had power either over tributary states further down the scale, or directly over "his" people, wherever they lived. No ruler had authority over unpopulated areas.

The personal relationship between overlord and subordinate rulers also defined the dynamic of relationship within a mandala. The relations between Dharmasetu of Srivijaya and Samaratungga of Sailendra, for instance, defined the succession of this dynastic family. Dharmasetu was the Srivijayan Maharaja overlord, while the house of Sailendra in Java is suggested to be related and was subscribed to Srivijayan mandala domination. After Samaratungga married Princess Tara, the daughter of Dharmasetu, Samaratungga became his successor and the house of Sailendra was promoted to become the dynastic lineage of later Srivijayan kings, and for a century the centre of Srivijaya was shifted from Sumatra to Java.

== Non-exclusivity ==
The overlord-tributary relationship was not necessarily exclusive. A state in border areas might pay tribute to two or three stronger powers. The tributary ruler could then play the stronger powers against one another to minimize interference by either one, while for the major powers the tributaries served as a buffer zone to prevent direct conflict between them. For example, the Malay kingdoms in Malay Peninsula, Langkasuka and Tambralinga earlier were subject to Srivijayan mandala, and in later periods contested by both Ayutthaya mandala in the north and Majapahit mandala in the south, before finally gaining its own gravity during Malacca Sultanate.

== See also ==
- Greater India § Indianization of Southeast Asia
- History of Indian influence on Southeast Asia
- Zomia - the huge mass of mainland Southeast Asia that has historically been beyond the control of governments based in the population centres of the lowlands
- Devaraja - Hindu-Buddhist concept of deified royalty in Southeast Asia
- Indian influences in early Philippine polities - mandalas of Srivijaya
- Monthon - Siamese system of local administration from 1897 to 1933
- Rajamandala - "circle of states" in India from 4th century BC to 2nd century AD
- Hegemony - similar European concept
- Tusi – system of local chiefdoms in southern China
- Palace economy - centralized administration methods in antiquity
- Sphere of influence

== General references ==
- Chandler, David. A History of Cambodia. Westview Press, 1983. ISBN 978-0-8133-3511-7
- Chutintaranond, Sunait (1990). "Mandala, Segmentary State and Politics of Centralization in Medieval Ayudhya" (free). Journal of the Siam Society. JSS Vol. 78.1 (digital). Siam Heritage Trust. "... I am interested in the ways in which Kautilya's theory of mandala has been interpreted by historians for the purpose of studying ancient states in South and Southeast Asia."
- Lieberman, Victor, Strange Parallels: Southeast Asia in Global Context, c. 800-1830, Volume 1: Integration on the Mainland, Cambridge University Press, 2003.
- Stuart-Fox, Martin, The Lao Kingdom of Lan Xang: Rise and Decline, White Lotus, 1998.
- Tambiah, S. J., World Conqueror and World Renouncer, Cambridge, 1976.
- Thongchai Winichakul. Siam Mapped. University of Hawaii Press, 1994. ISBN 978-0-8248-1974-3
- Wolters, O.W. History, Culture and Region in Southeast Asian Perspectives. Institute of Southeast Asian Studies, 1982. ISBN 978-0-87727-725-5
- Wolters, O.W. History, Culture and Region in Southeast Asian Perspectives. Institute of Southeast Asian Studies, Revised Edition, 1999.
- Wyatt, David. Thailand: A Short History (2nd edition). Yale University Press, 2003. ISBN 978-0-300-08475-7
