= Maravijayottunggavarman =

Maravijayottunggavarman was a king of the Srivijaya Kingdom of Shailendra dynasty, who reigned between 1008-c.1025 CE. He was the son of King Chudamani Varmadeva. He was called Se-li-ma-la-pi in the Chinese chronicle.

== Biography ==
Maravijayottunggavarman started his reign around 1008 CE, when he was recorded to have sent three envoys to the emperor of China. Srivijaya was also in a good relationship with the Chola Empire, which at that time was under King Rajaraja I. The Leiden Inscription (1044 CE) mentions that Maravijayottunggavarman even built a Buddhist vihara known as Chudamani Vihara at Nagapattinam, dedicated to his late father's name.

Chinese sources also speak of a major warfare between his kingdom and the Kingdom of Mataram of East Java. In 1016 CE, Srivijaya may be assisting a rebellious vassal state of Mataram, causing the death of King Dharmavangsa Teguh Anantavikrama and the destruction of Mataram Kingdom.

== See also ==
- Srivijaya
- Chudamani Vihara
