= Sri Indravarman =

Sri Indravarman was an 8th-century king of the Srivijaya Kingdom who sent three emissaries to the Chinese Tang dynasty, first in 702 CE, second in 716 CE, and third in 724 CE. His name was recorded in the Chinese sources as Che-li-t'o-lo-pa-mo. He was also recorded to have sent two letters to the Arabian Umayyad caliphs, first in c. 680 CE and second in 718 CE. Listed among the Srivijayan gifts to the Chinese emperor was a ts'engchi (from Arabic: zanji, black people) slave, presumably received from its Arabic connection.

These relationships suggested that Srivijaya during his reign already had good international trades with the outside world, both from West and East Asia.

Indravarman was succeeded by his son Rudra Vikrama, who continued sending embassies to China.
