= Srivijaya =

Empire based on Sumatra (c. 671–1025 AD)

Srivijaya Kadatuan Śrīvijaya
- c. 671–1025
- The maximum extent of Srivijaya around the 8th to the 11th century with a series of Srivijayan expeditions and conquest

- Map of the expansion of the Srivijaya empire, beginning in Palembang in the 7th century, then extending to most of Sumatra, then expanding to Java, Riau Islands, Bangka Belitung, Singapore, Malay Peninsula, Thailand, Cambodia, South Vietnam, Kalimantan, Sarawak, Brunei, Sabah, and ended as the Kingdom of Dharmasraya in Jambi in the 13th century.
- Capital: Palembang
- Common languages: Old Malay
- Religion: Buddhism; Hinduism
- Government: Monarchy, mandala state
- Maharaja
  - c. 683: Dapunta Hyang Sri Jayanasa
  - c. 775: Dharmasetu
  - c. 792: Samaratungga
  - c. 835: Balaputra
  - c. 988: Sri Cudamani Warmadewa
- History
  - Founded: c. 671
  - Conquest of Kedah: c. 682–685
  - Mataram–Srivijayan wars: c. 937–1016
  - Chola invasion of Srivijaya: 1025

Area
- 1200 est.: 1,200,000 km^{2} (460,000 sq mi)
- Currency: Early Nusantara coins
Preceded by	Succeeded by
Kantoli	Melayu Kingdom

Srivijaya, also spelled Sri Vijaya or Sriwijaya, was a Malay Buddhist thalassocratic empire based on the island of Sumatra (in modern-day Indonesia) that influenced much of Southeast Asia. Srivijaya was an important centre for the expansion of Buddhism from the 7th to 11th century. Srivijaya was the first polity to dominate much of western Maritime Southeast Asia. Its economy became progressively reliant on the booming trade in the region, thus transforming it into a prestige goods-based economy.

The earliest reference to it dates from the 7th century. A Tang dynasty Chinese monk, Yijing, wrote that he visited Srivijaya for six months in 671 AD. The earliest known inscription in which the name Srivijaya appears also dates from the 7th century in the Kedukan Bukit inscription found near Palembang, Sumatra, dated 16 June 682. Between the late 7th and early 11th century, Srivijaya rose to become a hegemon in Southeast Asia.

Srivijaya's main foreign interest was nurturing lucrative trade agreements with China which lasted from the Tang to the Song dynasty. Srivijaya had religious, cultural and trade links with the Buddhist Pala of Bengal, as well as with the Islamic Caliphate in the Middle East.

Although it was once thought of as a maritime empire, new research on available records suggests that Srivijaya was primarily a land-based polity rather than a maritime power; fleets were available but acted as logistical support to facilitate the projection of land power. In response to the change in the maritime Asian economy, and threatened by the loss of its dependencies, the kingdoms around the Strait of Malacca developed a naval strategy to delay their decline. The naval strategy was mainly punitive; this was done to coerce trading ships to be called to their port. Later, the naval strategy degenerated to raiding fleet.

The kingdom may have disintegrated after 1025 following several major raids launched by the Chola Empire upon their ports. Chinese sources continued to refer a polity named Sanfoqi thought to be Srivijaya for a few centuries, but some historians argued that Srivijaya would no longer be the appropriate name for the overlord's centre after 1025, when Sanfoqi referred to Jambi. After Srivijaya fell, it was largely forgotten. It was not until 1918 that French historian George Cœdès, of the French School of the Far East, formally postulated its existence.

== Etymology ==
Srivijaya is a Sanskrit-derived name: श्रीविजय, Śrīvijaya. Śrī means "fortunate", "prosperous", or "happy" and also has some association with the divine, at least in Hinduism. Vijaya means "victorious" or "excellence". Thus, the combined word Srivijaya means "shining victory", "splendid triumph", "prosperous victor", "radiance of excellence" or simply "glorious".

Early 20th-century historians who studied the inscriptions of Sumatra and the neighboring islands thought that the term "Srivijaya" referred to a king's name. In 1913, H. Kern was the first epigraphist that identified the name "Srivijaya" written in a 7th-century Kota Kapur inscription (discovered in 1892). However, at that time he believed that it referred to a king named "Vijaya", with "Sri" as an honorific title for a king or ruler.

The Sundanese manuscript of Carita Parahyangan, composed around the late 16th century in West Java, mentioned the name "Sang Sri Wijaya". The manuscript describes princely hero that rose to be a king named Sanjaya that—after he secured his rule in Java—was involved in battle with the Malayu and Keling against their king Sang Sri Wijaya. (Note: Carita Parahyangan Canto XI: Ti inya Rahiyang Sanjaya nyabrang ka désa Malayu. Diprang di Kemir, éléh Rahiyangtang Gana. Diprang deui ka Keling, éléh Sang Sriwijaya.)

Subsequently, after studying local stone inscriptions, manuscripts and Chinese historical accounts, historians concluded that the term "Srivijaya" was in reference to a polity or kingdom. The main concern is to define Srivijaya's amorphous statehood as a thalassocracy, which dominated a confederation of semi autonomous harbour cities in Maritime Southeast Asia.

== Historiography ==
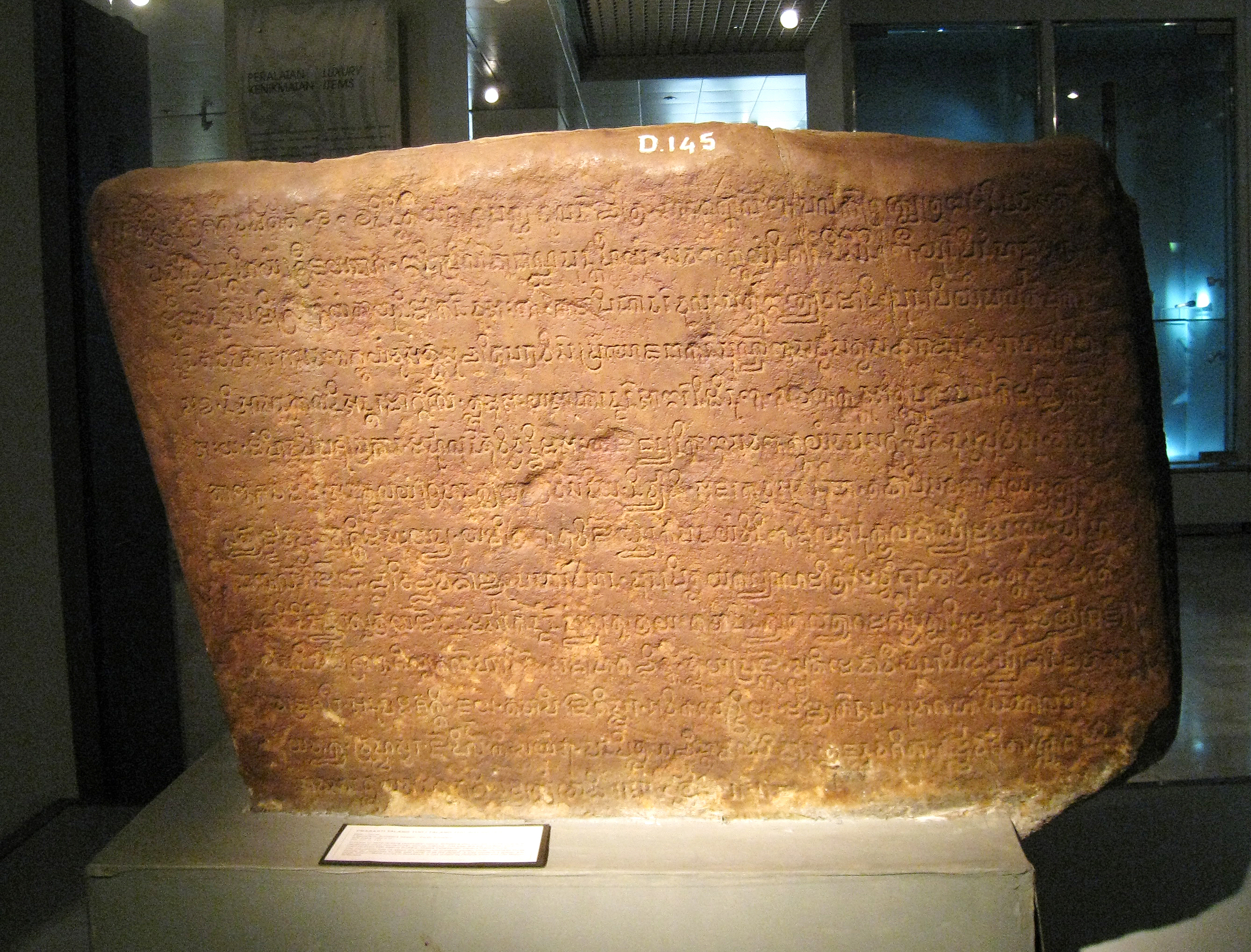
Talang Tuwo inscription, discovered in Bukit Seguntang area, tells the establishment of the sacred Śrīksetra park.

Little physical evidence of Srivijaya remains. There had been no continuous knowledge of the history of Srivijaya even in Indonesia and Maritime Southeast Asia; its forgotten past has been resurrected by foreign scholars. Contemporary Indonesians, even those from the area of Palembang (around where the kingdom was based), had not heard of Srivijaya until the 1920s when the French scholar, George Cœdès, published his discoveries and interpretations in Dutch and Malay newspapers. Cœdès noted that the Chinese references to Sanfoqi, previously read as Sribhoja or Sribogha, and the inscriptions in Old Malay refer to the same empire.

The Srivijayan historiography is based on two main sources: the Chinese historical accounts and the Southeast Asian stone inscriptions that have been discovered and deciphered in the region. The Buddhist monk Yijing's account is especially important in describing Srivijaya, when he visited the kingdom in 671 for six months. The 7th-century siddhayatra inscriptions discovered in Palembang and Bangka Island are also vital primary historical sources.

The historical records of Srivijaya were reconstructed from a number of stone inscriptions, most of them written in Old Malay using Pallava script, such as the Kedukan Bukit, Talang Tuwo, Telaga Batu and Kota Kapur inscriptions. Srivijaya became a symbol of early Sumatran importance as a great empire to balance Java's Majapahit in the east.

In the 20th century, both empires were referred to by nationalistic intellectuals to argue for an Indonesian identity within a united Indonesian state that had existed prior to the colonial state of the Dutch East Indies.

Srivijaya, and by extension Sumatra, had been known by different names to different peoples. The Chinese called it Sanfotsi, Sanfoqi or Che-li-fo-che (Shilifoshi), and there was an even older kingdom of Kantoli, which could be considered the predecessor of Srivijaya. The Arabs called Sriwijaya as Sribuza, while the Javanese called them Suvarnabhumi and Suvarnadvipa. This is another reason why the discovery of Srivijaya was so difficult.

== Capital ==
=== Palembang ===
According to the Kedukan Bukit inscription, dated 605 Saka (683), Srivijaya was first established in the vicinity of today's Palembang, on the banks of the Musi River. It mentions that Dapunta Hyang Sri Jayanasa came from Minanga Tamwan. The exact location of Minanga Tamwan is still a subject of discussion. The Palembang theory as the place where Srivijaya was first established was presented by Cœdes and supported by Pierre-Yves Manguin. Soekmono, on the other hand, argues that Palembang was not the capital of Srivijaya and suggests that the Kampar River system in Riau where the Muara Takus temple is located as Minanga Tamwan. However, a recent study suggests that Minanga Tamwan is located by the upper Komering River in modern Minanga village, Cempaka district, East Ogan Komering Ulu Regency, South Sumatra. Komering River is a tributary of the Musi River, with its confluence located in Palembang.

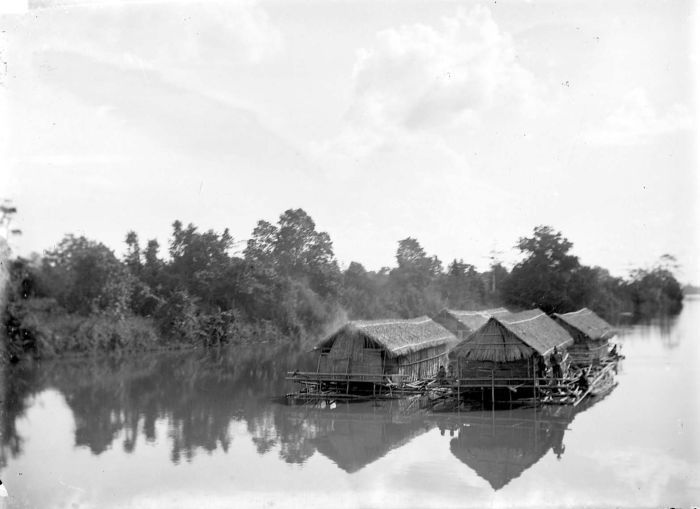
Floating houses in Musi River bank near Palembang in 1917. The Srivijayan capital was probably formed from a collection of floating houses like this.

Other than the Kedukan Bukit inscription and other Srivijayan inscriptions, immediately to the west of modern Palembang city, a quantity of artefacts have been revealed through archaeological surveys commenced since the 20th century. Artefacts unearthed include large amounts of Chinese ceramics and Indian rouletted ware remains, also the ruins of stupa at the foot of Bukit Seguntang. Furthermore, a significant number of Hindu-Buddhist statuary has been recovered from the Musi River basin. These discoveries reinforce the suggestion that Palembang was the centre of Srivijaya. Nevertheless, Palembang left little archaeological traces of ancient urban settlement. This is probably because of the nature of Palembang's environment — a low-lying plain which is frequently flooded by the Musi River. Experts suggests that the ancient Palembang settlement was formed as a collection of floating houses made from thatched materials, such as wood, bamboo and straw. Zhao Rukuo's 13th century Chinese account Zhu Fan Zhi confirmed this; "The residents of Sanfo-tsi (Srivijaya) live scattered outside the city on the water, within rafts lined with reeds." It was probably that only Kedatuan (king's court) and religious structures were built on land, while the people live in floating houses along the Musi River.

Palembang and its relevance to the early Malay state were controversial in terms of its evidence build-up through the archaeological record. Strong historical evidence found in Chinese sources, speaking of city-like settlements as early as 700 AD, and later Arab travelers, who visited the region during the 10th and 11th centuries, held written proof, named the kingdom of Srivijaya. As far as early state-like polities in the Malay Archipelago, the geographical location of modern Palembang was a possible candidate for the 1st-millennium kingdom settlement like Srivijaya as it is the best described and most secure in historical context, its prestige was apparent in wealth and urban characteristics, and the most unique, which no other 1st-millennium kingdom held, was its location in junction to three major rivers, the Musi River, the Komering River, and the Ogan River. The historical evidence was contrasted in 1975 with publications by Bennet Bronson and Jan Wisseman. Findings at certain major excavation sites, such as Geding Suro, Penyaringan Air Bersih, Sarang Wati, and Bukit Seguntang, conducted in the region played major roles in the negative evidence of the 1st-millennium kingdom in the same region. It was noted that the region contained no locatable settlements earlier than the middle of the second millennium.

Lack of evidence of southern settlements in the archaeological record comes from the disinterest in the archeologist and the unclear physical visibility of the settlements themselves. Archeology of the 1920s and 1930s focused more on art and epigraphy found in the regions. Some northern urban settlements were sited due to some overlap in fitting the sinocentric model of city-state urban centres. An approach to differentiate between urban settlements in the southern regions from the northern ones of Southeast Asia was initiated by a proposition for an alternative model. Excavations showed failed signs of a complex urban centre under the lens of a sinocentric model, leading to parameters of a new proposed model. Parameters for such a model of a city-like settlement included isolation in relevance to its hinterland. No hinterland makes low archaeological visibility. The settlement must also have access to both easy transportation and major interregional trade routes, crucial in a region with few resources. Access to the former and later played a major role in the creation of an extreme economic surplus in the absence of an exploited hinterland. The urban centre must be able to organize politically without the need for ceremonial foci such as temples, monuments and inscriptions. Lastly, habitations must be impermanent, being highly probable in the region Palembang and of southern Southeast Asia. Such a model was proposed to challenge city concepts of ancient urban centres in Southeast Asia and basic postulates themselves such as regions found in the south, like Palembang, based their achievements in correlation with urbanization.

Srivijaya Archaeological Park (green) located southwest from the centre of Palembang. The site forms an axis connecting Bukit Seguntang and Musi River.

Due to the contradicting pattern found in southern regions, like Palembang, in 1977 Bennet Bronson developed a speculative model for a better understanding of coastal-oriented states in Insular Southeast Asia, such as insular and Peninsular Malaysia, the Philippines, and western Indonesia. Its main focus was the relationship of political, economic and geographical systems. The general political and economic pattern of the region seems irrelevant to other parts of the world of their time, but in correlation with their maritime trade network, it produced high levels of socio-economic complexity. He concluded, from his earlier publications in 1974 that state development in this region developed much differently than the rest of early Southeast Asia. Bronson's model was based on the dendritic patterns of a drainage basin where its opening leads out to sea. Being that historical evidence places the capital in Palembang, and in junction of three rivers, the Musi River, the Komering River, and the Ogan River, such model can be applied. For the system to function appropriately, several constraints are required. The inability for terrestrial transportation results in movements of all goods through water routes, lining up economical patterns with the dendritic patterns formed by the streams. The second being the overseas centre is economically superior to the ports found at the mouth of the rivers, having a higher population and a more productive and technologically advanced economy. Lastly, constraints on the land work against and do not develop urban settlements.

An aerial photograph taken in 1984 near Palembang (in what is now Srivijaya Archaeological Park) revealed the remnants of ancient man-made canals, moats, ponds, and artificial islands, suggesting the location of Srivijaya's urban centre. Several artefacts such as fragments of inscriptions, Buddhist statues, beads, pottery and Chinese ceramics were found, confirming that the area had once been densely populated. By 1993, Pierre-Yves Manguin had shown that the centre of Srivijaya was along the Musi River between Bukit Seguntang and Sabokingking (situated in what is now Palembang, South Sumatra, Indonesia). Palembang is called in Chinese: 巨港; pinyin: Jù gǎng; lit. 'Giant Harbour', this is probably a testament of its history as a once a great port.

In 2021 a number of treasures were found in the shallows and riverbed of the Musi River by local fishermen during a dive. The treasures included coins of various periods, gold jewelries, Buddhist statues, gems, colourful beads, and Chinese ceramic fragments. However, these troves were immediately lost as local treasure hunters sold them to international antiquities dealers before archaeologists could properly study them. These discoveries led to the treasure rush in the Musi River in 2021, where locals formed groups of treasure divers operating in parts of the Musi River in and around Palembang. These troves seem to confirm that Palembang was indeed the commercial centre of Srivijaya.

=== Jambi ===
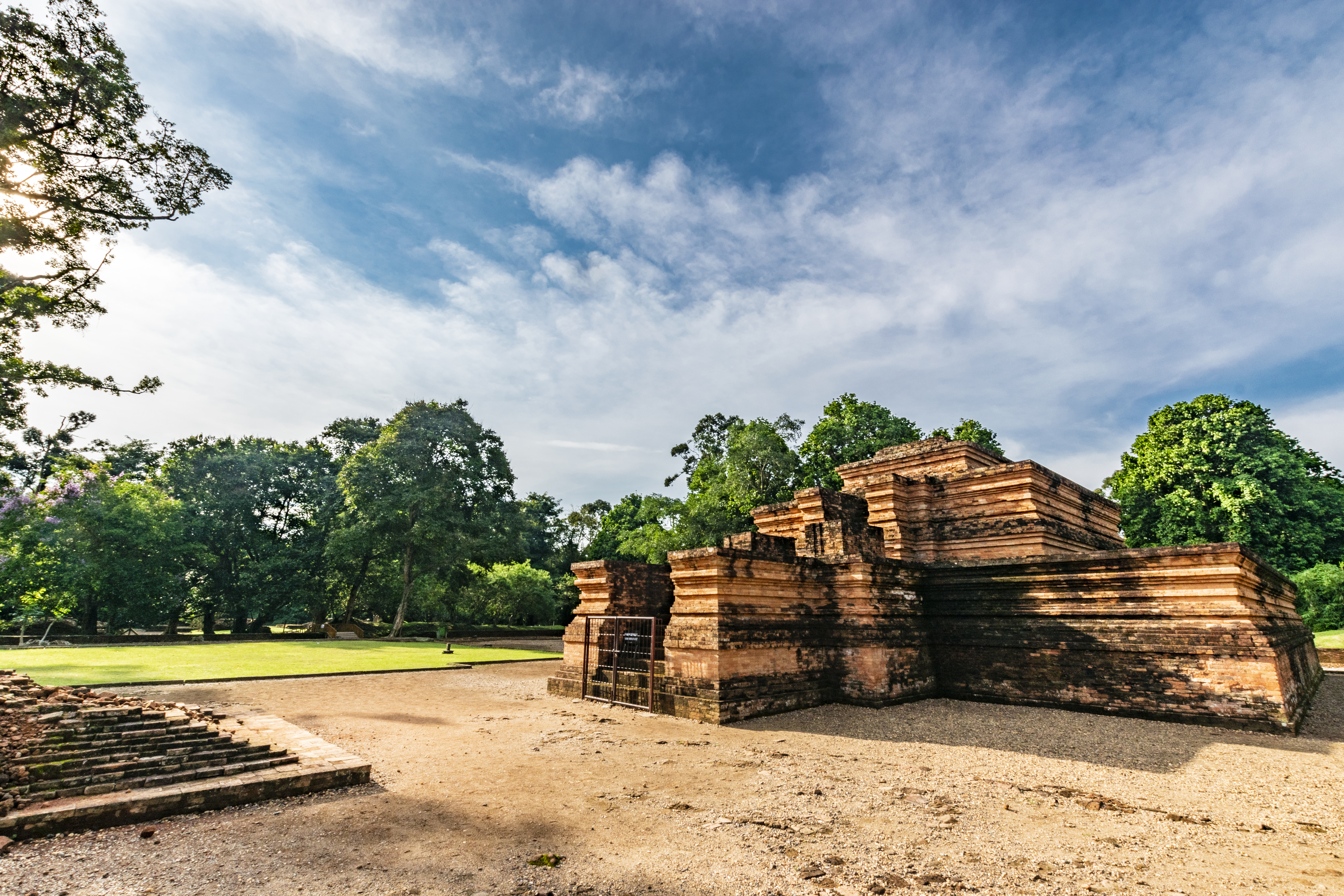
Muaro Jambi Buddhist temple compound, a possible location of Srivijaya's religious centre

Some scholars argue that the centre of Srivijaya was located in Muaro Jambi, and not Palembang. In 2013, archaeological research led by the University of Indonesia discovered several religious and habitation sites at the Muaro Jambi Temple Compounds, suggesting that the initial centre of Srivijaya was located in the Muaro Jambi Regency, Jambi on the Batang Hari River, rather than on the originally-proposed Musi River. The archaeological site includes eight excavated temple sanctuaries and covers about 12 square kilometers, and stretches 7.5 kilometers along the Batang Hari River, while 80 mounds (menapos) of temple ruins, are not yet restored. The Muaro Jambi archaeological site was Mahayana-Vajrayana Buddhist in nature, which suggests that the site served as a Buddhist learning centre, connected to the 10th century Buddhist scholar Suvarṇadvipi Dharmakīrti. Chinese sources also mentioned that Srivijaya hosted thousands of Buddhist monks.

Compared to Palembang, Muaro Jambi has richer archaeological sites, i.e. multiple red brick temples and building structures along the Batang Hari river whilst Pelembang has no comparable temples or building structures. The proponents of the theory that Muaro Jambi was Srivijaya's capital point out that the descriptions written by Yijing and Zhao Rukuo, the description of Srivijaya realms by the Cholas and archaeological findings, suggest that Srivijaya's capital fits Muaro Jambi's environment better than the marshy Palembang. The study also compares the environment, geographical location, and the economic wealth of both cities; arguing that Jambi, located on the mouth of the Batang Hari River basin with its connection to Minangkabau hinterland was the centre of gold trade in the area, that described as the fabulous wealth of Srivijaya.

=== Central Java ===
In the second half of the eighth century, the Srivijayan mandala seems to have been ruled by the Sailendra dynasty of Central Java. Several Arabic sources mentioned that Zabag (the Javanese Sailendra dynasty) ruled over Sribuza (Srivijaya), Kalah (a place in the Malay Peninsula, probably Kedah), and Ramni (a place in Sumatra, probably Lambri). However, it's unknown whether Srivijaya's capital moved to Java or Srivijaya simply became a subordinate of Java.

=== Other places ===
Another theory suggests that Dapunta Hyang came from the east coast of the Malay Peninsula, and that the Chaiya district in Surat Thani province, Thailand, was the centre of Srivijaya. The Srivijayan Period is referred to as the time when Srivijaya ruled over present-day southern Thailand. In the region of Chaiya, there is clear evidence of Srivijayan influence seen in artwork inspired by Mahayana Buddhism. Because of the large amount of remains, such as the Ligor stele, found in this region, some scholars have attempted to prove that Chaiya was the capital. This period was also a time for art. The Buddhist art of the Srivijayan Kingdom was believed to have borrowed from Indian styles like that of the Dvaravati school of art. Some scholars believe that Chaiya probably comes from Srivijaya. It was a regional capital in Srivijaya. Some Thai historians argue it was the capital of Srivijaya itself, but this is generally discounted.

== History ==
=== Formation and growth ===
==== Siddhayatra ====
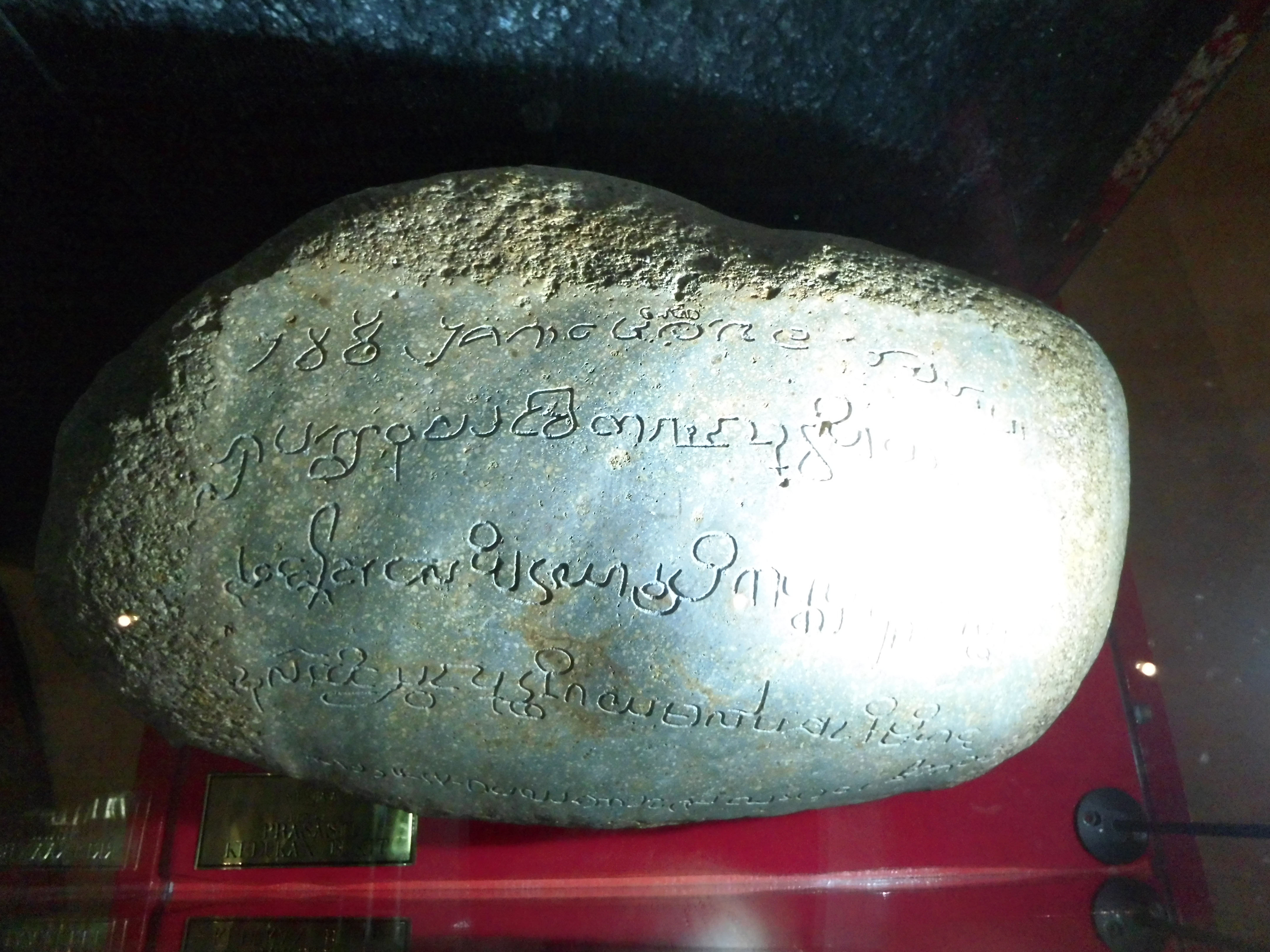
The Kedukan Bukit inscription displayed in the National Museum of Indonesia

Around 500 AD, the roots of the Srivijayan empire began to develop around present-day Palembang, Sumatra. The Kedukan Bukit inscription (683)—considered to be the oldest inscription related to Srivijaya, discovered on the banks of the Tatang River near the Karanganyar site, states about the "glorious Srivijaya", (Note: Kedukan Bukit inscription 10th line: Śrīvijaya jaya siddhayātra subhikṣa nityakāla (... Glorious Sriwijaya! prosperity and riches...)) a kadatuan (kingdom or polity) which was founded by Dapunta Hyang Sri Jayanasa and his retinue. He had embarked on a sacred siddhayatra (Note: According to Coedès, siddhayatra refers to some "magic potion". An alternative translation, however, is possible: Zoetmulder's Dictionary of Old Javanese (1995) renders it as "a prosperous journey".) journey and led 20,000 troops and 312 people in boats with 1,312 foot soldiers from Minanga Tamwan to Jambi and Palembang. Many of these armed forces gathered under Srivijayan rule would have been the sea people, referred to generally as the orang laut. In establishing its power, Srivijaya had first to consolidate its position in Southeast Sumatra, which at that time consisted of multiple quasi-independent polities ruled by local Datus (chieftain).

Under the leadership of Dapunta Hyang Sri Jayanasa, the Melayu Kingdom became the first kingdom to be integrated into Srivijaya. This possibly occurred in the 680s. Melayu, also known as Jambi, was rich in gold and was held in high esteem at the time. Srivijaya recognised that the submission of Melayu would increase its own prestige.

The empire was organised in three main zones: the estuarine capital region centred on Palembang, the Musi River basin which served as a hinterland, and estuarine areas capable of forming rival power centres. The areas upstream of the Musi River were rich in various commodities valuable to Chinese traders. The capital was administered directly by the ruler, while the hinterland remained under local datus or tribal chiefs, who were organised into a network of alliances with the Srivijaya maharaja or king. Force was the dominant element in the empire's relations with rival river systems such as the Batang Hari River, centred in Jambi.

The Telaga Batu inscription, discovered in Sabokingking, eastern Palembang, is also a siddhayatra inscription, from the 7th century. This inscription was very likely used in a ceremonial sumpah (allegiance ritual). The top of the stone is adorned with seven nāga heads, and on the lower portion there is a water spout to channel liquid that was likely poured over the stone during a ritual. The ritual included a curse upon those who commit treason against Kadatuan Srivijaya.

The Talang Tuwo inscription is also a siddhayatra inscription. Discovered in Seguntang Hill, western Palembang, this inscription describes the establishment of the Śrīksetra garden endowed by King Jayanasa of Srivijaya for the well-being of all creatures. It is likely that the Seguntang Hill site was the location of the Śrīksetra garden.

==== Regional conquests ====
According to the Kota Kapur inscription discovered on Bangka Island, the empire conquered most of southern Sumatra and the neighbouring island of Bangka as far as Palas Pasemah in Lampung. Also, according to the inscriptions, Dapunta Hyang Sri Jayanasa launched a military campaign against Java in the late 7th century, a period which coincided with the decline of Tarumanagara in West Java and the Kalingga in Central Java. The empire thus grew to control trade on the Strait of Malacca.

=== Golden age ===
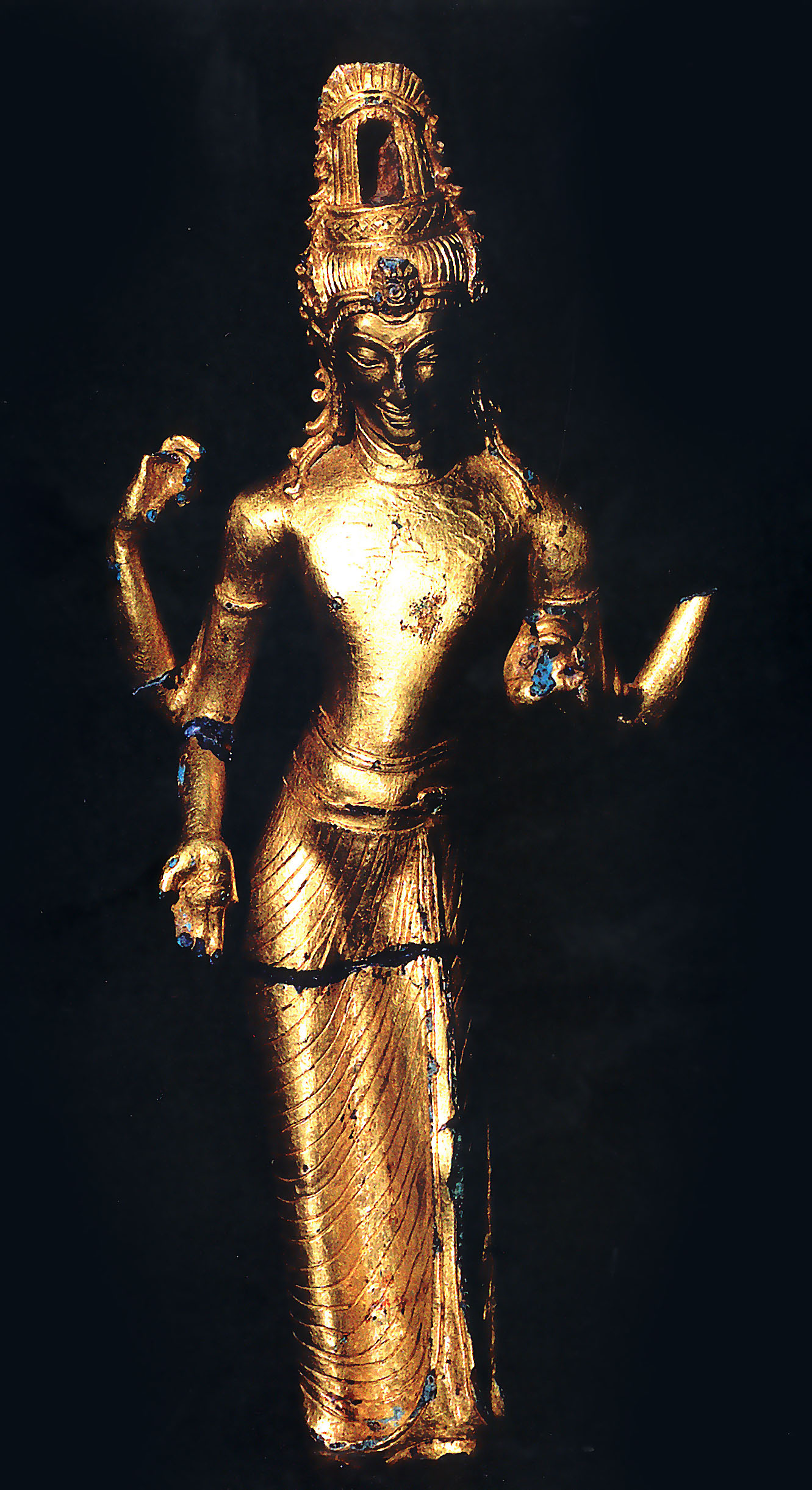
The golden Malayu-Srivijayan Avalokiteśvara Bodhisattva in Rataukapastuo, Muarabulian, Jambi, Indonesia

==== Conquest of the Malay Peninsula ====
Malay polities in Sumatra and Malay Peninsula. By the turn of the 8th century the states in Sumatra and Malay Peninsula were under Srivijayan domination.

During the 7th century, Langkasuka on the Malay Peninsula became part of Srivijaya. Soon after this, Pan Pan and Tambralinga, north of Langkasuka, came under Srivijayan influence. These kingdoms on the peninsula were major trading nations that transported goods across the Kra Isthmus.

The Ligor inscription in Vat Sema Muang says that Maharaja Dharmasetu of Srivijaya ordered the construction of three sanctuaries dedicated to the Bodhisattvas Padmapani, Vajrapani, and Buddha in the northern Malay Peninsula.

==== Sailendra dynasty rule ====
The Sailendras of Java established a relationship with the Sumatran Srivijayan lineage, and then further established their rule and authority in the Mataram kingdom of Central Java. It is unknown what the exact nature of their relationship was, with Arab sources mentioning that Zabag (Java) ruled over Sribuza (Srivijaya), Kalah (a place in the Malay peninsula, probably Kedah), and Ramni (a place in Sumatra, probably Lambri).

In Java, Dharanindra's successor was Samaragrawira (r. 800–819), mentioned in the Nalanda inscription (dated 860) as the father of Balaputradewa, and the son of Śailendravamsatilaka (the jewel of the Śailendra family) with the stylised name Śrīviravairimathana (the slayer of a heroic enemy), which refers to Dharanindra. Unlike his predecessor, the expansive and warlike Dharanindra, Samaragrawira seems to have been a pacifist, enjoying the peaceful prosperity of interior Java in the Kedu Plain and being more interested in completing the Borobudur project. It was in these years, at the beginning of the 9th century, that the Khmer prince Jayavarman II was appointed governor of Indrapura in the Mekong Delta under Sailendran rule. This decision was later proven to be a mistake, as Jayavarman II revolted, moved his capital further inland north from Tonle Sap to Mahendraparvata, severing the link to Srivijaya and proclaimed Khmer independent from Java in 802. (Note: Some academics, such as Charles Higham and Michael Vickery, disputed Coedès' assumption that Jayavarman II lived in Java for some time. They asserted that people living in Cambodian regions near the former territory of Champa used the Khmer word chvea, which normally refers to the Indonesian island of Java, for the Cham. Jayavarman II, moreover, started his career in a town in the east of Cambodia, a region near Champa, cf. Charles Higham, The Civilization of Angkor (Weidenfeld & Nicolson, London 2001, p. 56). Arlo Griffiths, however, refuted these theories and convincingly demonstrated that Java in the inscriptions both in the continent of Southeast Asia and in the Indonesian and Malaysian archipelago refer to the Indonesian island of Java, see his article 'The Problem of the Ancient Name Java and the Role of Satyavarman in Southeast Asian International Relations around the Turn of the Ninth Century CE' (Archipel 85/1 (2013), p. 43-81).) Samaragrawira was mentioned as the king of Java that married Tārā, daughter of Dharmasetu. He was mentioned by his other name Rakai Warak in the Mantyasih inscription.

Earlier historians, such as N. J. Krom and Cœdes, tend to equate Samaragrawira and Samaratungga as the same person. However, later historians such as Slamet Muljana equate Samaratungga with Rakai Garung, mentioned in the Mantyasih inscription as the 5th monarch of the Mataram kingdom. This would mean that Samaratungga was the successor of Samaragrawira.

Dewi Tara, the daughter of Dharmasetu, married Samaratunga, a member of the Sailendra family who assumed the throne of Srivijaya around 792. By the 8th century, the Srivijayan court was virtually located in Java, as the Sailendras monarch rose to become the Maharaja of Srivijaya.

After Dharmasetu, Samaratungga became the next Maharaja of Srivijaya. He reigned from 792 to 835. Unlike the expansionist Dharmasetu, Samaratungga did not indulge in military expansion but preferred to strengthen the Srivijayan hold on Java. He personally oversaw the construction of the grand monument of Borobudur; a massive stone mandala, which was completed in 825, during his reign. According to Cœdès, "In the second half of the ninth century Java and Sumatra were united under the rule of a Sailendra reigning in Java... its center at Palembang." Samaratungga, like Samaragrawira, seems to have been influenced by peaceful Mahayana Buddhist beliefs and strove to become a peaceful and benevolent ruler. His successor was Princess Pramodhawardhani who was betrothed to Shivaite Rakai Pikatan, son of the influential Rakai Patapan, a landlord in Central Java. The political move that seemed to be an effort to secure peace and Sailendran rule on Java by reconciling the Mahayana Buddhist with Shivaist Hindus.

==== Return to Palembang ====
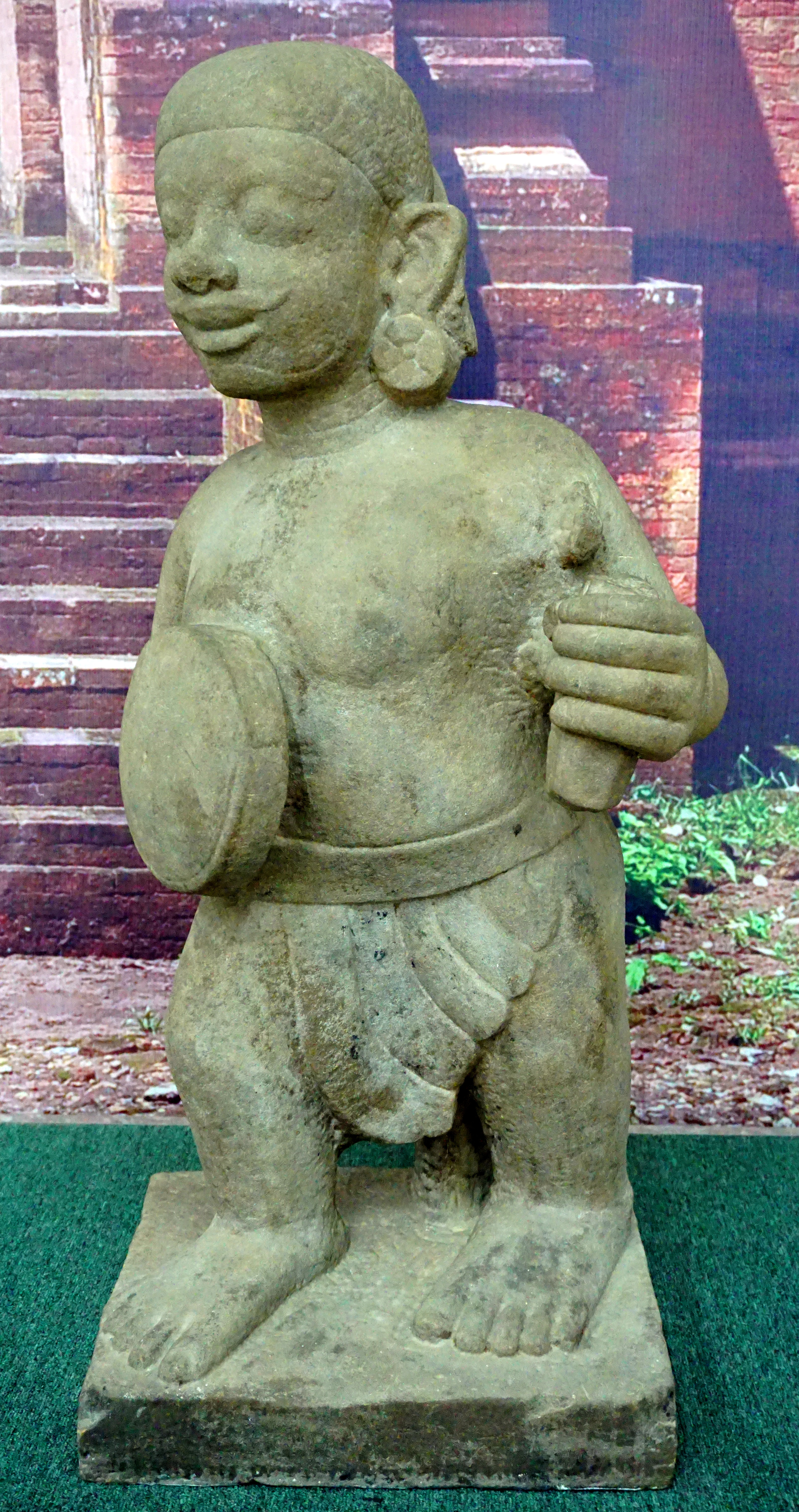
A guardian (dvarapala) statue from Muaro Jambi.

Prince Balaputra, however, opposed the rule of Pikatan and Pramodhawardhani in Central Java. The relations between Balaputra and Pramodhawardhani are interpreted differently by some historians. An older theory according to Bosch and De Casparis holds that Balaputra was the son of Samaratungga, which means he was the younger brother of Pramodhawardhani. Later historians such as Muljana, argued that Balaputra was the son of Samaragrawira and the younger brother of Samaratungga, which would make him the uncle of Pramodhawardhani.

It is not known whether Balaputra was expelled from Central Java because of a succession dispute with Pikatan, or already ruled in Sumatra. Either way, it seems that Balaputra eventually ruled the Sumatran branch of Sailendra dynasty and was enthroned in the Srivijayan capital of Palembang. Historians have argued that this was because Balaputra's mother Tara, the queen consort of King Samaragrawira, was the princess of Srivijaya, making Balaputra the heir of the Srivijayan throne. Balaputra the Maharaja of Srivijaya later stated his claim as the rightful heir of the Sailendra dynasty from Java, as proclaimed in the Nalanda inscription dated 860.

After a trade disruption at Canton between 820 and 850, the ruler of Jambi (Melayu Kingdom) was able to assert enough independence to send missions to China in 853 and 871. The Melayu Kingdom's independence coincided with the troubled times when the Sailendran Balaputradewa was expelled from Java and later seized the throne of Srivijaya. The new maharaja was able to dispatch a tributary mission to China by 902. Two years after that, the weakening Tang dynasty conferred a title on a Srivijayan envoy.

In the first half of the 10th century, between the fall of Tang dynasty and the rise of Song, there was brisk trading between the overseas world with the Fujian kingdom of Min and the rich Guangdong kingdom of Nan Han. Srivijaya undoubtedly benefited from this. Sometime around 903, the Muslim writer Ibn Rustah was so impressed with the wealth of the Srivijayan ruler that he declared that one would not hear of a king who was richer, stronger or had more revenue. The main urban centres of Srivijaya were then at Palembang (especially the Karanganyar site near Seguntang Hill area), Muara Jambi and Kedah.

==== War against Java ====
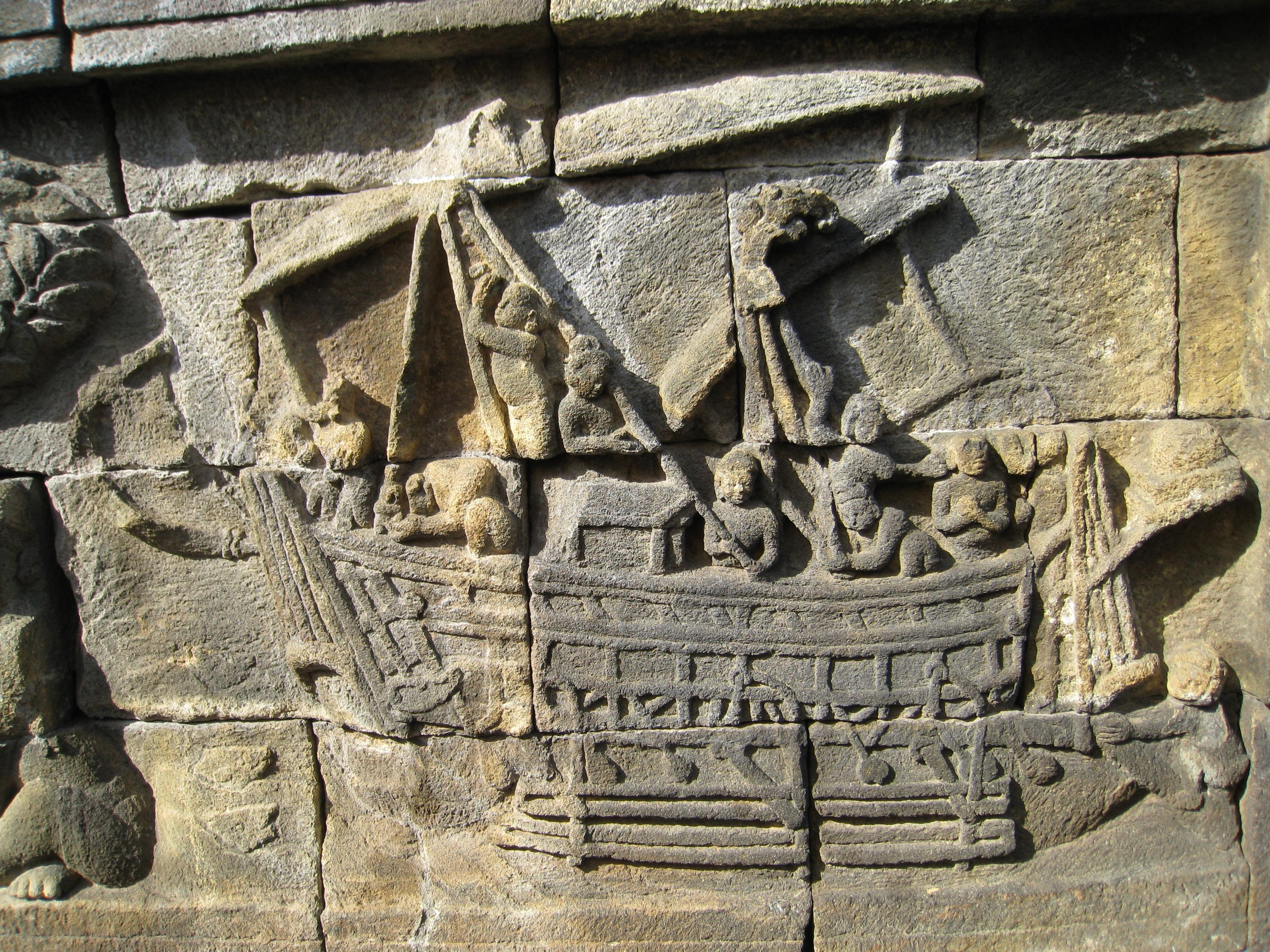
Ancient Javanese vessel depicted in Borobudur

In the 10th century, the rivalry between Sumatran Srivijaya and the Javanese Mataram kingdom became more intense and hostile. The animosity was probably caused by Srivijaya's effort to reclaim the Sailendra lands in Java or by Mataram's aspiration to challenge Srivijaya domination in the region. In East Java, the Anjukladang inscription dated 937 mentions an infiltration attack from Malayu — which refers to a Srivijayan attack upon the Mataram Kingdom of East Java. The villagers of Anjuk Ladang were awarded for their service and merit in assisting the king's army, under the leadership of Mpu Sindok, in repelling invading Malayu (Sumatra) forces; subsequently, a jayastambha (victory monument) was erected in their honor.

In 990, King Dharmawangsa of Java launched a naval invasion against Srivijaya and attempted to capture the capital Palembang. The news of the Javanese invasion of Srivijaya was recorded in Chinese Song period sources. In 988, a Srivijayan envoy was sent to the Chinese court in Guangzhou. After sojourning for about two years in China, the envoy learned that his country had been attacked by Java which made him unable to return home. In 992 an envoy from Java arrived in the Chinese court and explained that their country was involved in continuous war with Srivijaya. In 999 the Srivijayan envoy sailed from China to Champa in an attempt to return home, however, he received no news about the condition of his country. The Srivijayan envoy then sailed back to China and appealed to the Chinese Emperor for the protection of Srivijaya against Javanese invaders.

Dharmawangsa's invasion led the Maharaja of Srivijaya, Sri Cudamani Warmadewa, to seek protection from China. Warmadewa was known as an able and astute ruler, with shrewd diplomatic skills. In the midst of the crisis brought by the Javanese invasion, he secured Chinese political support by appeasing the Chinese Emperor. In 1003, a Song historical record reported that the envoy of San-fo-qi was dispatched by the king Shi-li-zhu-luo-wu-ni-fo-ma-tiao-hua (Sri Cudamani Warmadewa). The Srivijayan envoy told the Chinese court that in their country a Buddhist temple had been erected to pray for the long life of Chinese Emperor, and asked the emperor to give the name and the bell for this temple which was built in his honor. Rejoiced, the Chinese Emperor named the temple Ch'eng-t'en-wan-shou ('ten thousand years of receiving blessing from heaven, which is China) and a bell was immediately cast and sent to Srivijaya to be installed in the temple.

In 1006, Srivijaya's alliance proved its resilience by successfully repelling the Javanese invasion. This attack opened the eyes of Srivijayan Maharaja to the threat of the Javanese Mataram Kingdom, so he laid a plan to destroy his Javanese rival. Srivijaya assisted Haji (king) Wurawari of Lwaram to revolt, which led to the attack and destruction of the Mataram palace. This sudden and unexpected attack took place during the wedding ceremony of Dharmawangsa's daughter, which left the court unprepared and shocked. With the death of Dharmawangsa and the fall of the Mataram capital, Srivijaya contributed to the collapse of Mataram kingdom, leaving Eastern Java in further unrest, violence and, ultimately, desolation for several years to come.

=== Decline ===
==== Chola invasion ====
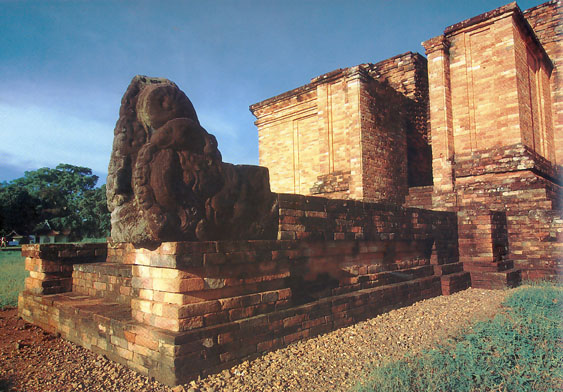
Candi Gumpung, a Buddhist temple at the Muaro Jambi Temple Compounds of the Melayu Kingdom, later integrated as one of Srivijaya's important urban centre

The factors in the decline of Srivijaya were foreign piracy and raids that disrupted trade and security in the region. Rajendra Chola, the Chola king from Tamil Nadu in South India, launched naval raids on ports of Srivijaya in 1025. His navy sailed swiftly to Sumatra using monsoon winds, made a stealth attack and raided Srivijaya's 14 ports. The strike took Srivijaya by surprise and unprepared; they first ransacked the capital city of Palembang and then swiftly moved on to other ports including Kadaram (modern Kedah).

The Cholas are known to have benefitted from both piracy and foreign trade. At times, the Chola's seafaring led to outright plunder and conquest as far as Southeast Asia. An inscription of King Rajendra states that he had captured the King of Kadaram, Sangrama Vijayatunggavarman, son of Mara Vijayatunggavarman, and plundered many treasures including the Vidhyadara-torana, the jewelled 'war gate' of Srivijaya adorned with great splendour.

According to the 15th-century Malay Annals, Rajendra Chola I after the successful naval raid in 1025 married Onang Kiu, the daughter of Vijayottunggavarman. This invasion forced Srivijaya to make peace with the Javanese kingdom of Kahuripan. The peace deal was brokered by the exiled daughter of Vijayottunggavarman, who managed to escape the destruction of Palembang, and came to the court of King Airlangga in East Java. She also became the queen consort of Airlangga named Dharmaprasadottungadevi and, in 1035, Airlangga constructed a Buddhist monastery named Srivijayasrama dedicated to his queen consort.

The Cholas continued a series of raids and conquests against parts of Sumatra and the Malay Peninsula for the next 20 years. The expedition of Rajendra Chola I had such a lasting impression on the Malay people of the period that his name is even mentioned (as Raja Chulan) in the Malay Annals. Even today the Chola rule is remembered in Malaysia as many Malaysian princes have names ending with Cholan or Chulan, such as the Raja of Perak, Raja Chulan.

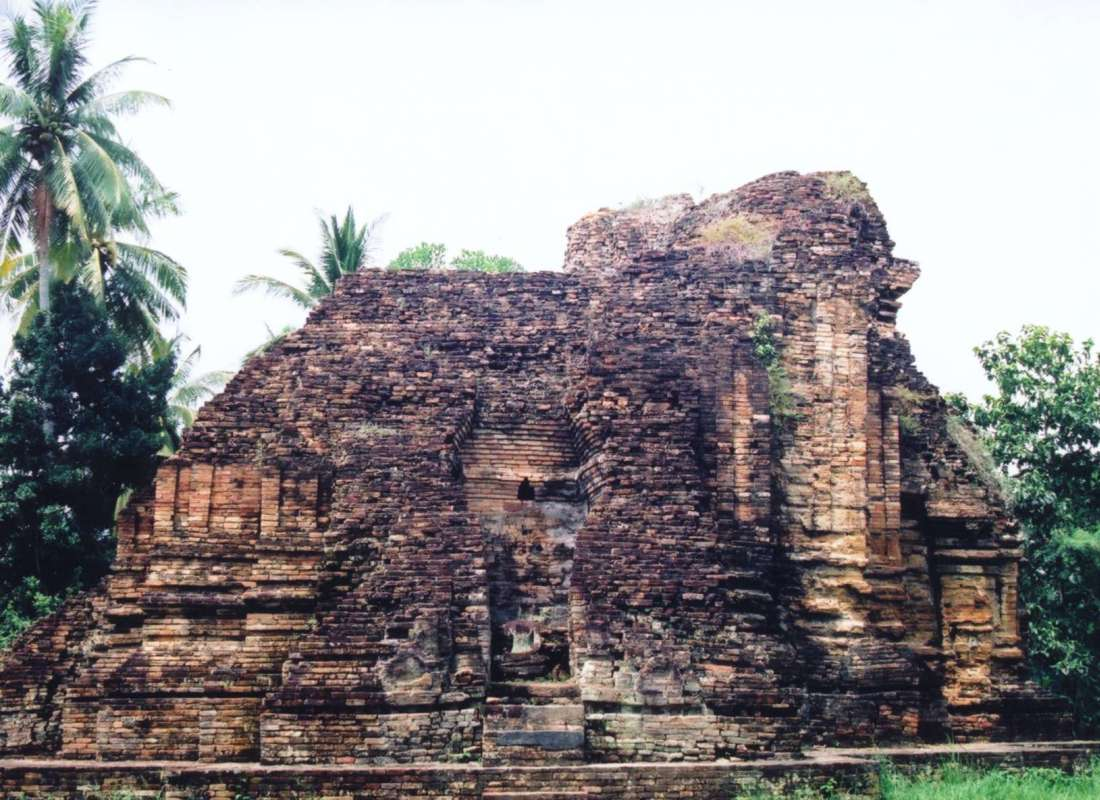
Ruins of the Wat Kaew in Chaiya, dating from Srivijayan times

Rajendra Chola's overseas expeditions against Srivijaya were unique in India's history and its otherwise peaceful relations with the states of Southeast Asia. The reasons for the naval expeditions are uncertain as the sources do not state its exact causes. Nilakanta Sastri suggests that the attacks were probably caused by Srivijaya's attempts to throw obstacles in the way of Chola's trade with the East or, more probably, a simple desire on the part of Rajendra Chola to extend his military victories to well known countries to gain prestige. The new research however, suggests that the attack was a pre-emptive strike with a commercial motive. Rajendra Chola's naval strike was a geostrategic manoeuvre.

The raids gravely weakened the Srivijayan hegemony and enabled the formation of regional kingdoms like Kediri, which were based on intensive agriculture rather than coastal and long-distance trade. With the passing of time, the regional trading centre shifted from the old Srivijayan capital of Palembang to another trade centre on the island of Sumatra, Jambi, which was the centre of Malayu.

==== Under the Cholas ====
Sanfoqi sent a mission to China in 1028, but this would refer to Malayu-Jambi, not Srivijaya-Palembang. No Srivijayan envoys arrived in China between 1028 and 1077. This indicates that the mandala of Srivijaya has faded. It is very possible that Srivijaya collapsed in 1025. In the following centuries, Chinese chronicles still mentioned "Sanfoqi", but this term probably refers to the Malayu-Jambi kingdom, evidenced by the Chinese record of Sanfoqi Zhanbei guo (Jambi country of Sanfoqi). The last epigraphic evidence that mentions the word "Sriwijaya" or "Srivijaya" comes from the Tanjore inscription of the Chola kingdom in 1030 or 1031.

Chola control over Srivijaya lasted for several decades. Chinese chronicles mentioned Sanfoqi Zhu-nian guo which means "Chola country of Sanfoqi", likely refer to Kedah. Sanfoqi Zhu-nian guo sent missions to China in 1077, 1079, 1082, 1088, and 1090. It is possible that the Cholas installed a crown prince in the Tamil-dominated area of the Malacca Strait.

There is also evidence to suggest that Kulottunga Chola, the maternal grandson of emperor Rajendra Chola I, in his youth (1063) was in Srivijaya, restoring order and maintaining Chola influence in that area. Virarajendra Chola states in his inscription, dated in the 7th year of his reign, that he conquered Kadaram (Kedah) and gave it back to its king who came and worshiped his feet. These expeditions were led by Kulottunga to help the Sailendra king who had sought the help of Virarajendra Chola. An inscription of Canton mentions Ti-hua-kialo as the ruler of Srivijaya. According to historians, this ruler is the same as the Chola ruler Ti-hua-kialo (identified with Kulottunga) mentioned in the Song annals and who sent an embassy to China. According to Tan Yeok Song, the editor of the Srivijayan inscription of Canton, Kulottunga stayed in Kadaram (Kedah) after the naval expedition of 1067 and reinstalled its king before returning to South India and ascending the throne.

Tamil colonization of the Malacca Strait seems to have lasted for a century. The Cholas left several inscriptions in northern Sumatra and the Malay Peninsula. Tamil influence can be found in works of art (sculpture and temple architecture), it indicated government activity rather than commerce. Chola's grip on northern Sumatra and the Malay Peninsula receded in the 12th century — the Tamil poem Kalingatupparani of c. 1120 mentioned Kulottungga's destruction of Kadaram (Kedah). After that, Kedah disappeared from Indian sources.

==== Successor state Malayu Dharmasraya ====
After the fall of Shailendra dynasty in Sumatra in the 11th century, and a period of Chola involvements in the region, there are no clear records which can explain the period ensuing the fall of Srivijaya. Almost 150 years later, a new dynasty emerged in the region replacing the Sailendras. They were the Mauli dynasty that ruled the Melayu Kingdom in Jambi by the Batang Hari river valley. This late 12th century Malayu Dharmasraya kingdom can be considered as the successor of Srivijaya. The oldest inscription bearing the name of Maharaja Mauli is the Grahi inscription dated 1183.

== Government and economy ==
=== Political administration ===
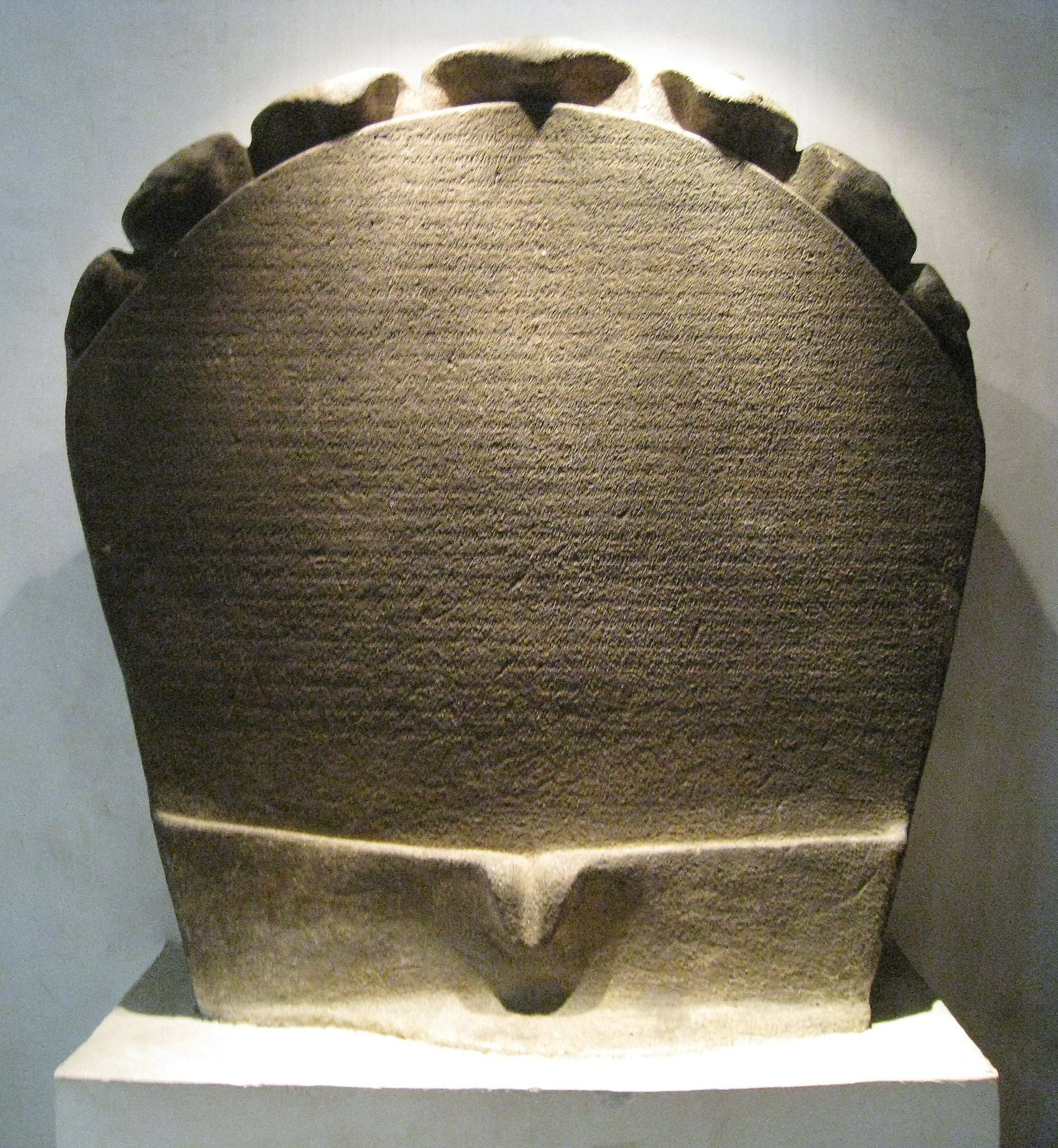
Telaga Batu inscription adorned with seven nāga heads on top, and a waterspout on the lower part to channel the water probably poured during a ceremonial allegiance ritual

The 7th century Telaga Batu inscription, discovered in Sabokingking, Palembang, testifies to the complexity and stratified titles of the Srivijayan state officials. These titles are mentioned: rājaputra (princes, lit: sons of king), kumārāmātya (ministers), bhūpati (regional rulers), senāpati (generals), nāyaka (local community leaders), pratyaya (nobles), hāji pratyaya (lesser kings), dandanayaka (judges), tuhā an vatak (workers inspectors), vuruh (workers), addhyāksi nījavarna (lower supervisors), vāsīkarana (blacksmiths/weapon makers), cātabhata (soldiers), adhikarana (officials), kāyastha (store workers), sthāpaka (artisans), puhāvam (ship captains), vaniyāga (traders), marsī hāji (king's servants), hulun hāji (king's slaves).

During its formation, the empire was organised in three main zones — the estuarine capital region centred on Palembang, the Musi River basin which served as hinterland and source of valuable goods, and rival estuarine areas capable of forming rival power centres. These rival estuarine areas, through raids and conquests, were held under Srivijayan power, such as the Batanghari estuarine (Malayu in Jambi). Several strategic ports also included places like Bangka Island (Kota Kapur), ports and kingdoms in Java (highly possible Tarumanagara and Kalingga), Kedah and Chaiya in Malay peninsula, and Lamuri and Pannai in northern Sumatra.

After its expansion to the neighbouring states, the Srivijayan empire was formed as a collection of several Kadatuans (local principalities), which swore allegiance to the central ruling powerful Kadatuan ruled by the Srivijayan Maharaja. The political relations and system relating to its realms is described as a mandala model, typical of that of classical Southeast Asian Hindu-Buddhist kingdoms. It could be described as federation of kingdoms or vassalised polity under a centre of domination, namely the central Kadatuan Srivijaya. The polity was defined by its centre rather than its boundaries and it could be composed of numerous other tributary polities without undergoing further administrative integration.

The relations between the central kadatuan and its member (subscribers) kadatuans were dynamic. As such, the status would shift over generations. Minor trading ports throughout the region were controlled by local vassal rulers in place on behalf of the king. They also presided over harvesting resources from their respective regions for export. A portion of their revenue was required to be paid to the king. They were not allowed to infringe upon international trade relations, but the temptation of keeping more money to themselves eventually led foreign traders and local rulers to conduct illicit trading relations of their own. Other sources claim that the Champa invasion had weakened the central government significantly, forcing vassals to keep the international trade revenue for themselves.

In addition to coercive methods through raids and conquests and being bound by pasumpahan (oath of allegiance), the royalties of each kadatuan often formed alliances through dynastic marriages. For example, a previously suzerained kadatuan over time might rise in prestige and power, so that eventually its ruler could lay claim to be the maharaja of the central kadatuan. The relationship between Srivijayan in Sumatra (descendants of Dapunta Hyang Sri Jayanasa) and Sailendras in Java exemplified this political dynamic.

=== Economy ===
==== Trade agreements and commerce ====
Expansion of Buddhism starting in the 5th century BC from northern India to the rest of Asia, which followed both inland and maritime trade routes of the Silk Road. Srivijaya once served as a centre of Buddhist learning and expansion. The overland and maritime "Silk Roads" were interlinked and complementary, forming what scholars have called the "great circle of Buddhism".

The main goal of Srivijayan foreign economic relations was to secure a lucrative trade agreement to serve the large Chinese market, that spanned from the Tang dynasty to the Song dynasty. In order to participate in this trade agreement, Srivijaya was involved in a tributary relation with China, in which they sent several envoys and embassies to secure the Chinese court's favour.

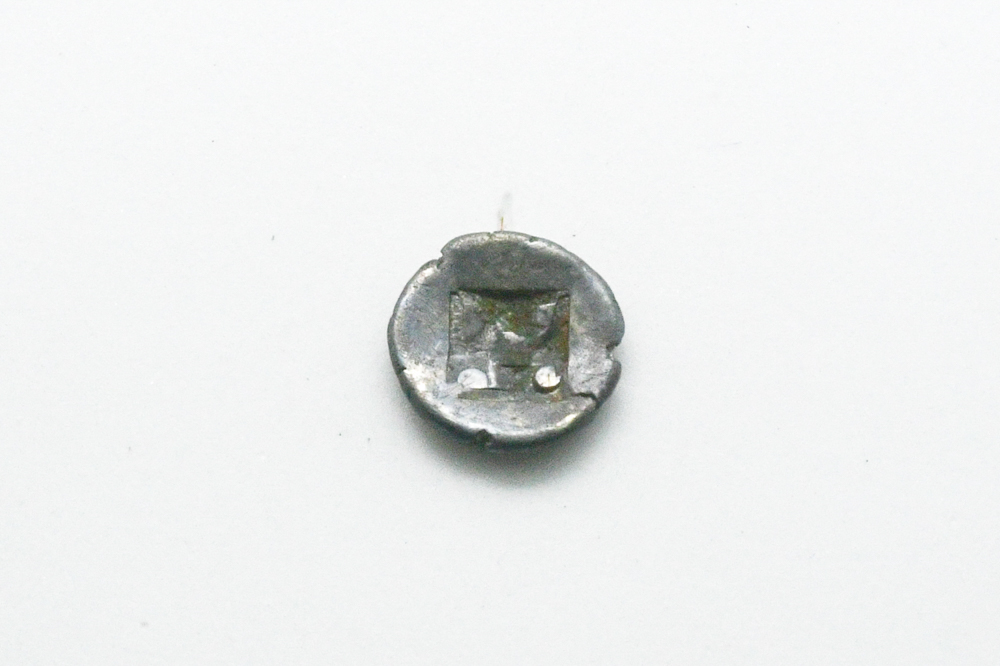
1 masa, silver coin of Srivijaya, circa 7th – 10th century

In the world of commerce, Srivijaya rose rapidly to be a far-flung empire controlling the two passages between India and China, namely the Sunda Strait from Palembang and the Malacca Strait from Kedah.

==== Riverine system model ====
Besides interregional trade agreements, the Srivijayan economy is also theorized to have adopted a "riverine system model", where dominance of a river-system and river-mouth centres guaranteed the kingdom's control of the flow of goods from the hinterland region upstream of the river; as well as control on trade within the Straits of Malacca and international trade routes going through the strait. Srivijaya's victory on its dominance of river-mouths centres on the Sumatra, Malaya and western Java coasts ensured Palembang's control over the region. This was accomplished through its system of: 'oath of allegiances' to local elites; its efforts on redistributions of wealth; and alliances made with local datus (chieftains) rather than on direct coercion.

==== Items of trade and barter system ====
The port of Srivijaya served as an important entrepôt in which valuable commodities from the region and beyond were collected, traded and shipped. Rice, cotton, indigo and silver from Java; aloes, resin, camphor, ivory, rhino horns, tin and gold from Sumatra and the Malay Peninsula; rattan, rare timber, camphor, gems and precious stones from Borneo; exotic birds and rare animals, iron, sappan, sandalwood, and rare spices including clove and nutmeg from the Eastern Indonesian archipelago; various spices of Southeast Asia and India including pepper, cubeb and cinnamon; also Chinese ceramics, lacquerware, brocade, fabrics, silks, and Chinese artwork were among valuable commodities being traded in Srivijayan ports. What goods were actually native to Srivijaya is currently disputed due to the volume of cargo that regularly passed through the region from India, China, and Arabia. Foreign traders stopped to trade their cargo in Srivijaya with other merchants from Southeast Asia and beyond. It was an easy location for traders from different regions to meet as opposed to visiting each other directly. This system of trade has led researchers to conjecture that the actual native products of Srivijaya were far less than what was originally recorded by Chinese and Arabic traders of the time. It may be that cargo sourced from foreign regions accumulated in Srivijaya. The accumulation of particular foreign goods that were easily accessible and in large supply might have given the impression they were products of Srivijaya. This could also work in the opposite direction with some native Srivijayan goods being mistaken as foreign commodities. Material evidence for the overland crossing survives at two river-mouth ports on opposite coasts of the Thai peninsula: Mueang Thong–Ko Kho Khao at the mouth of the Takua Pa on the Andaman side, and Laem Pho–Payang at the mouth of the Phum Riang on the gulf side. Tang glazed ware, Persian turquoise-glazed ware and mosaic glass beads of the 8th and 9th centuries have been recovered at both, and at hill sites inland from them.

Ceramics were a major trade commodity between Srivijaya and China with shard artefacts found along the coast of Sumatra and Java. It is assumed that China and Srivijaya may have had an exclusive ceramics trade relationship because particular ceramic shards can only be found at their point of origin, in Guangzhou, or in Indonesia, but nowhere else along the trade route. There have been some discrepancies with the dating of said artifacts. Ceramic sherds found around the Geding Suro temple complex have been revealed to be much more recent than previously assumed. A statuette found in the same area did align with Srivijayan chronology, but it has been suggested that this is merely a coincidence and the product was actually brought to the region recently.

The currency of the empire was gold and silver coins embossed with the image of the sandalwood flower (of which Srivijaya had a trade monopoly on) and the word "vara," or "glory," in Sanskrit. Other items could be used to barter with, such as porcelain, silk, sugar, iron, rice, dried galangal, rhubarb, and camphor.

==== Trade relations with Arabia ====
Other than fostering lucrative trade relations with India and China, Srivijaya also established commerce links with Arabia. In a highly plausible account, a messenger was sent by Maharaja Sri Indravarman to deliver a letter to Caliph Umar ibn Abd al-Aziz of the Umayyad Caliphate in 718. The messenger later returned to Srivijaya with a Zanji (a black female slave from Zanj), a gift from the Caliph to the Maharaja. Later, a Chinese chronicle made mention of Sri Indravarman and how the Maharaja of Srivijaya had sent the Chinese Emperor a ts'engchi (Chinese spelling of the Arabic Zanji) as a gift in 724.

Arab writers of the 9th and 10th century, in their writings, considered the king of Al-Hind (India and to some extent might include Southeast Asia) as one of the four great kings in the world. The reference to the kings of Al-Hind might have also included the kings of Southeast Asia; Sumatra, Java, Burma and Cambodia. They are, invariably, depicted by the Arab writers as extremely powerful and being equipped with vast armies of men, horses and having tens of thousands of elephants. They were also said to be in possession of vast treasures of gold and silver. Trading records from the 9th and 10th centuries mention Srivijaya, but do not expand upon regions further east, indicating that Arabic traders were not engaging with other regions in Southeast Asia, serving as further evidence of Srivijaya's important role as a link between the two regions.

=== Thalassocratic empire ===
For some periods, Srivijaya controlled the transoceanic trade in its central passage in the Strait of Malacca, as part of the Maritime Silk Road. This has led some historian to argue that the amorphous statehood of Srivijaya, which dominated a confederation of semi autonomous port cities in the Maritime Southeast Asia, was actually a Thalassocracy. However, the true nature of Srivijaya naval development and maritime hegemony is still a subject of studies and disagreements among historians.

Srivijaya benefited from the lucrative maritime trade between China and India as well as trading in products such as Maluku spices within the Malay Archipelago. Serving as Southeast Asia's main entrepôt and gaining trade patronage by the Chinese court, Srivijaya was constantly managing its trade networks and, was always wary of potential rival ports of its neighbouring kingdoms. A majority of the revenue from international trade was used to finance the military which was charged with the responsibility of protecting the ports. Some records even describe the use of iron chains to prevent pirate attacks.

Srivijayan settlers may have colonized some parts of Madagascar. The migration to Madagascar was estimated to have taken place around 830.

==== 7th to 11th centuries ====
Previously it was assumed that Srivijaya was a maritime power that could not be separated from ethnicity and society in the Malacca Strait. The assumption that occurs is that the formation of a successful state and hegemony in the strait is directly related to the ability to participate in international maritime activities, which means that a shore-based state like this develops and maintains its power with its navy. However, a survey of the available information shows that such an assumption is incorrect. Data on maritime activity are scanty and mentions of their navy occurs only in incomplete sources. Even the material aspects of Southeast Asian navies were not known until the 15th century, scientific attention generally focused on shipbuilding techniques.

In the Kedukan Bukit inscription (683 AD), it is recorded that only 312 people used boats out of a total force of 20,000 people, which also included 1312 land soldiers. The large number of ground troops shows that Srivijaya's navy only acted as a minor provider of logistical support. In the 8th century, Srivijaya's naval capabilities grew to match the proportion of its army strength, although it only played a role as logistical support.

The absence of any terms denoting maritime vessel for general use and military showed that the navy was not a permanent aspect of Srivijaya. Even when neighboring powers in maritime Asia, especially Java during the 10th to 14th centuries, and the Chola Empire in the 11th century, began to develop their navies, Srivijaya's naval power was relatively weak. For example, Songshi and Wenxian Tongkao note that between 990 and 991, a Srivijayan envoy was unable to return from South China to Palembang because of the ongoing military conflict between Java and Srivijaya. However the Javanese, Arabs from the Middle East, and South Asia were able to maintain diplomatic and economic exchanges with China during this time. The Javanese navy was strong enough to seriously disrupt Srivijaya's communications with China. Despite the naval confrontation between Java and Srivijaya, communication between the coastal governments of the Indian Ocean and China continued during this time, suggesting that the conflict did not always occur on the high seas, but was more likely to be confined to the estuaries and rivers around the Srivijayan capital of Palembang, the mouth of the Musi River and the Bangka Straits.

Srivijaya's response to Javanese aggression appeared to be defensive. In his account of Sanfoqi, Zhao Rugua records in Zhufanzhi (c. 1225):

In the past, [this state] used an iron chain as a barrier to prepare against other robbing parties (arriving on vessels?). There were opportunities to release (i.e. draw) it by hand. If merchant ships arrive, it has to be released".

The inability of the Malacca Strait states to respond to maritime threats became very clear in the early 11th century. Between 1017 and 1025, the Chola Empire raided the main Malay ports in the strait and the Gulf of Siam, including Kedah, Malay (Jambi), Lambri, Srivijaya, and Langkasuka, looted the Kedah treasury and captured Srivijayan rulers, a further indication of the incompetence of the Malacca Strait states to defend themselves from naval attacks.

Until the 11th century, at least in terms of their military outlook, the kingdom was arguably land-based. Only with the changing international context from the 11th century onwards, marked initially by the Chola attacks, and then with the increasing presence of Chinese merchants directly operating in Southeast Asian waters, coupled with the emergence of new powers on the seafront, did the role and nature of these navies begin to change.

==== 12th to 13th centuries ====
After the Chola attack, historians believe that Srivijaya may be no longer the appropriate name for the overlord's centre, and epigraphic references to 'Sriwijaya' also ceased after the attack. However, the Chinese term for Srivijaya, namely Sanfoqi, was still used centuries later, but after 1025 the term Sanfoqi referred to the Malayu Dharmasraya kingdom where the mandala was re-centred. The new records appeared in the Lingwai daida (1178 AD), written by Zhou Qufei:

This country (Sanfoqi) has no products, but its people are well trained in warfare. When they put medicine on their body, they can't be hurt. In offensive naval warfare, their attacks are unmatched. Therefore, neighboring countries are aligned with it. If foreign ships passing through the vicinity do not call in this state, [vessels] are sent to teach them a lesson and to kill. Therefore, the state is rich, with rhino horn, elephant [tusks] (ivory), pearls, aromatics and medicines.

Similar information about Sanfoqi is also recorded in Zhufanzhi (c. 1225), which records:

All are excellent in maritime and land warfare. At any time that a mobilisation order is established, chieftains [are the ones who] command [the troops]. All of them prepare and equip [themselves] with soldiers, equipment, and food. Arriving at the enemy, they dare to die (i.e. are not afraid of dying). [Hence it is regarded as] the elder of the various states (i.e. first amongst equals)... This state is at the middle of the sea, controlling the choke-point through which the various foreign vessels come and go. In the past, [it] used an iron chain as a barrier... This year (i.e. presently), it is not taut (i.e. not extended) and not used, [lying in a] pile in the water... If merchant ships cross [the vicinity] and do not enter [i.e. call at the port], then ships are dispatched to do battle [with them]. They have to die (i.e. the persons onboard the merchant ships have to be killed). Hence, this state (Sanfoqi) is a great shipping centre.

This information may refer to sea and river warfare in particular given the extensive navigation capabilities of the Musi and Batang Hari rivers where the main centres of the kingdoms around the Malacca Strait (Palembang and Jambi) were located. These records show that both the nature of the navy and the role it played in the survival of the government itself, in the late 12th and 13th centuries, became very different.

At the same time, the 12th century saw the beginning of the decline of the empires around the Malacca Strait and in the eyes of its foreign partners. Kedah fell outside the influence of Sanfoqi during the 11th century. By the early 13th century, Pahang, Kuala Beranang and Kompei had established direct economic links with the Chinese port of Quanzhou. Jambi became independent from Sanfoqi's influence in the early 13th century, while Ligor fell under the influence of Tambralingga in the 1230s.

After Singhasari's attack on Malayu in 1275, a large number of Malay port-states emerged in the strait, each seeking to engage directly with foreign traders, with varying degrees of success. Therefore, the development of an increasingly proactive naval strategy was not only a reaction to the changing nature of interactions with major trading partners such as China and India, but also as a result of the polities' declining power.

==== Ship types ====
Textual record of Srivijayan vessels are very lacking, as Old Malay epigraphical records rarely mentioned watercraft. The Kedukan Bukit inscription (683 AD) mentioned samvau (modern Malay: Sampan). A ship type called lancang is identified as a Malay type of ship in later records, but during the Srivijaya era, the ship was mentioned in 2 inscriptions on the northern coast of Bali dated 896 and 923. These inscriptions are written in the Old Balinese language, and not in Old Malay.

==== Srivijayan exploration ====
The core of the Srivijayan realm was concentrated in and around the Malacca and Sunda straits and in Sumatra, the Malay Peninsula and Western Java. However, between the 9th and the 12th centuries, the influence of Srivijaya seems to have extended far beyond this core. Srivijayan navigators may have reached as far as Madagascar. The migration to Madagascar was estimated to have taken place around 830. According to an extensive mitochondrial DNA study, native Malagasy people today can likely trace their heritage back to 30 founding mothers who sailed from Indonesia 1,200 years ago. Malagasy contains loan words from Sanskrit, with all the local linguistic modifications via Javanese or Malay, hinting that Madagascar may have been colonised by settlers from Srivijaya.

== Culture and society ==
Srivijaya-Palembang's significance both as a centre for trade and for the practice of Vajrayana Buddhism has been established by Arab and Chinese historical records over several centuries. Srivijaya' own historical documents, inscriptions in Old Malay, are limited to the second half of the 7th century. The inscriptions uncover the hierarchical leadership system, in which the king is served by many other high-status officials. A complex, stratified, cosmopolitan and prosperous society with their tastes in art, literature and culture, with complex set of rituals, influenced by Mahayana Buddhism; blossomed in ancient Srivijayan society. Their complex social order can be seen through studies on inscriptions, foreign accounts, and in bas-reliefs of temples from this period. Their accomplished artistry was evidenced from a number of Srivijayan Mahayana Buddhist statues discovered in the region. The kingdom had developed a complex society; which was characterised by the heterogeneity of their society, inequality of social stratification, and the formation of national administrative institution in their kingdom. Some forms of metallurgy were used as jewelry, coins and as decorative status symbols.

=== Art and culture ===
Srivijayan art

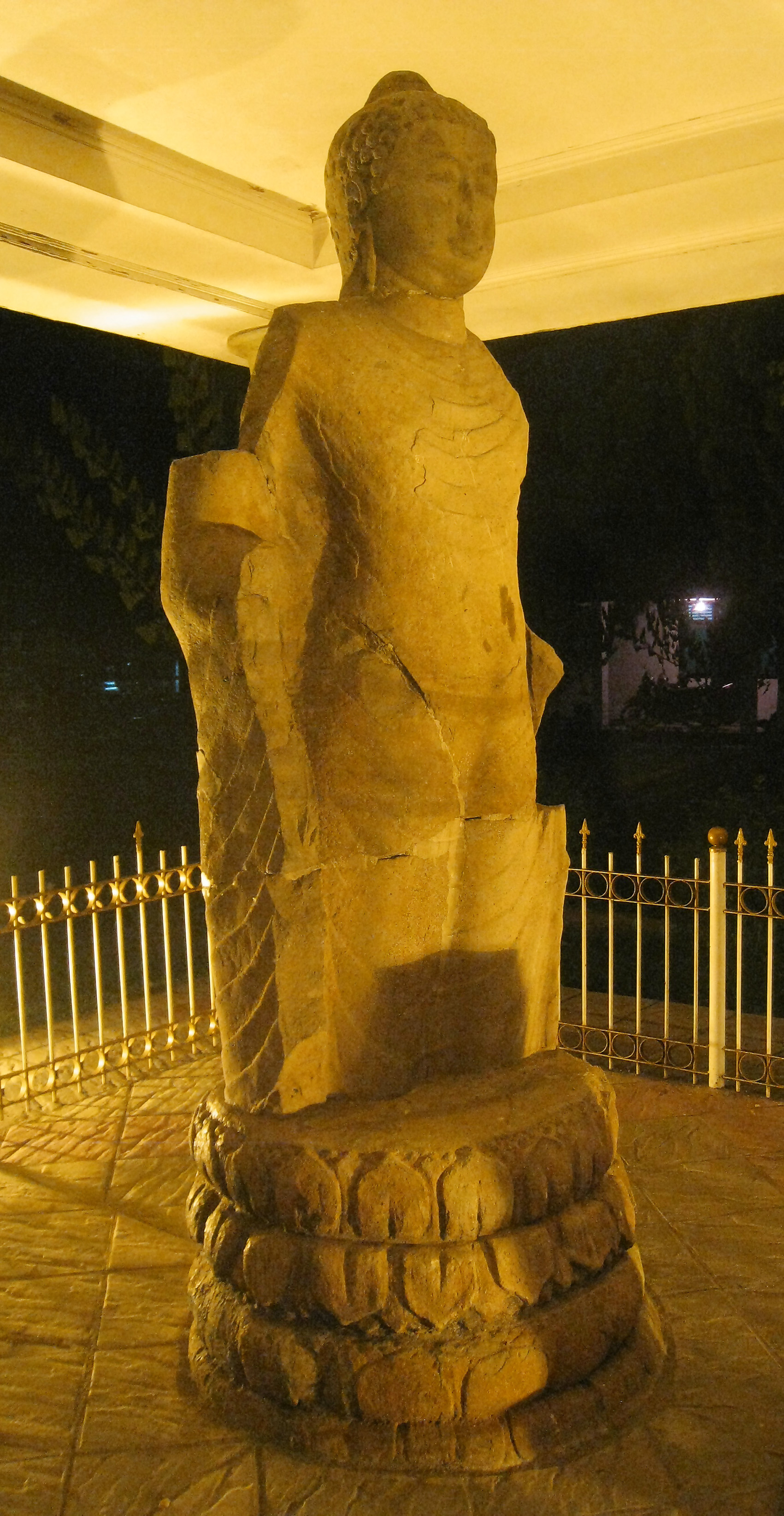
A 2.77 metres tall statue of Buddha in Amaravati style, from Bukit Seguntang, Palembang, c. 7th–8th century

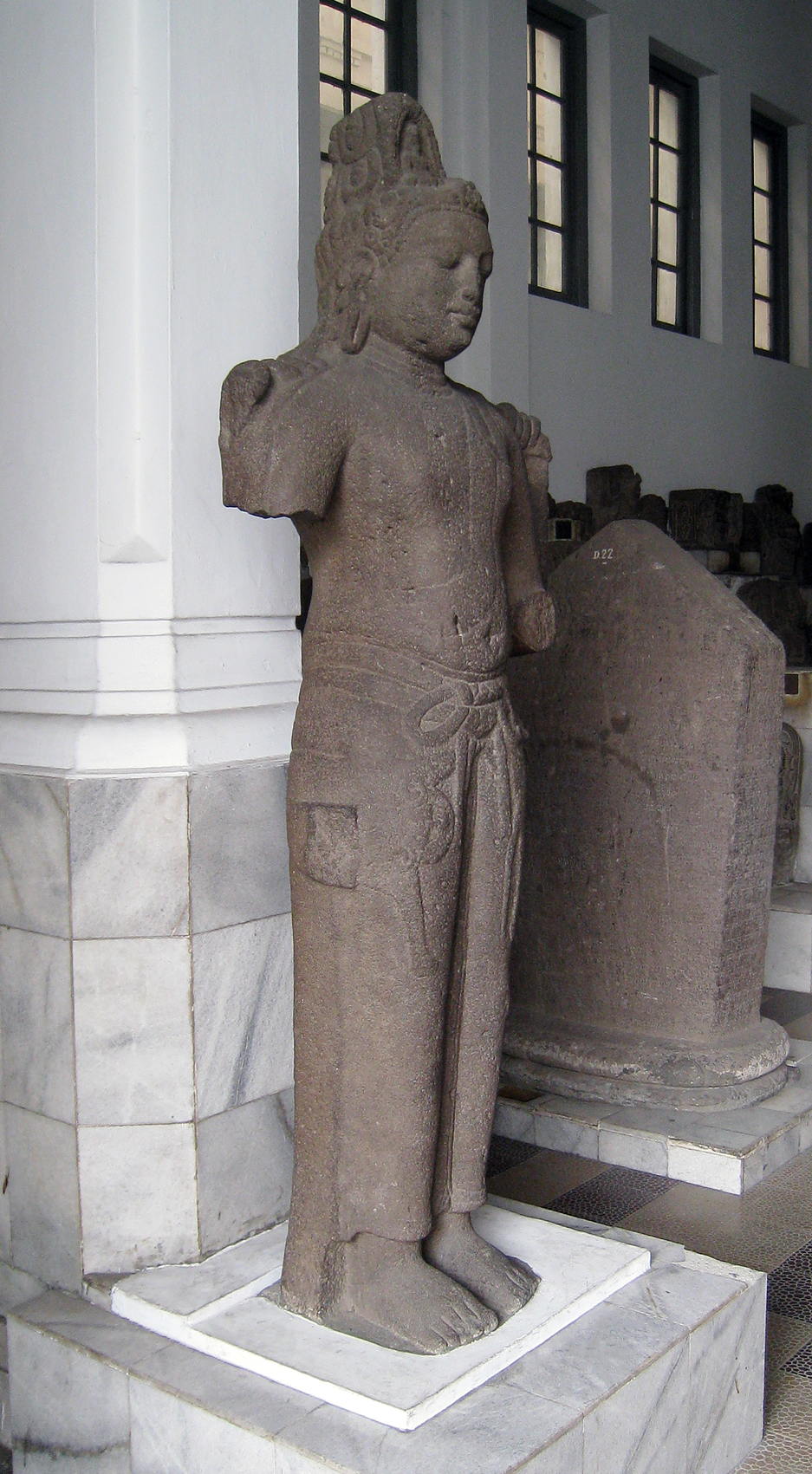
Avalokiteshvara Bingin Jungut, Musi Rawas, South Sumatra. Srivijayan art (c. 8th–9th century CE) resemble Central Java Sailendran art.

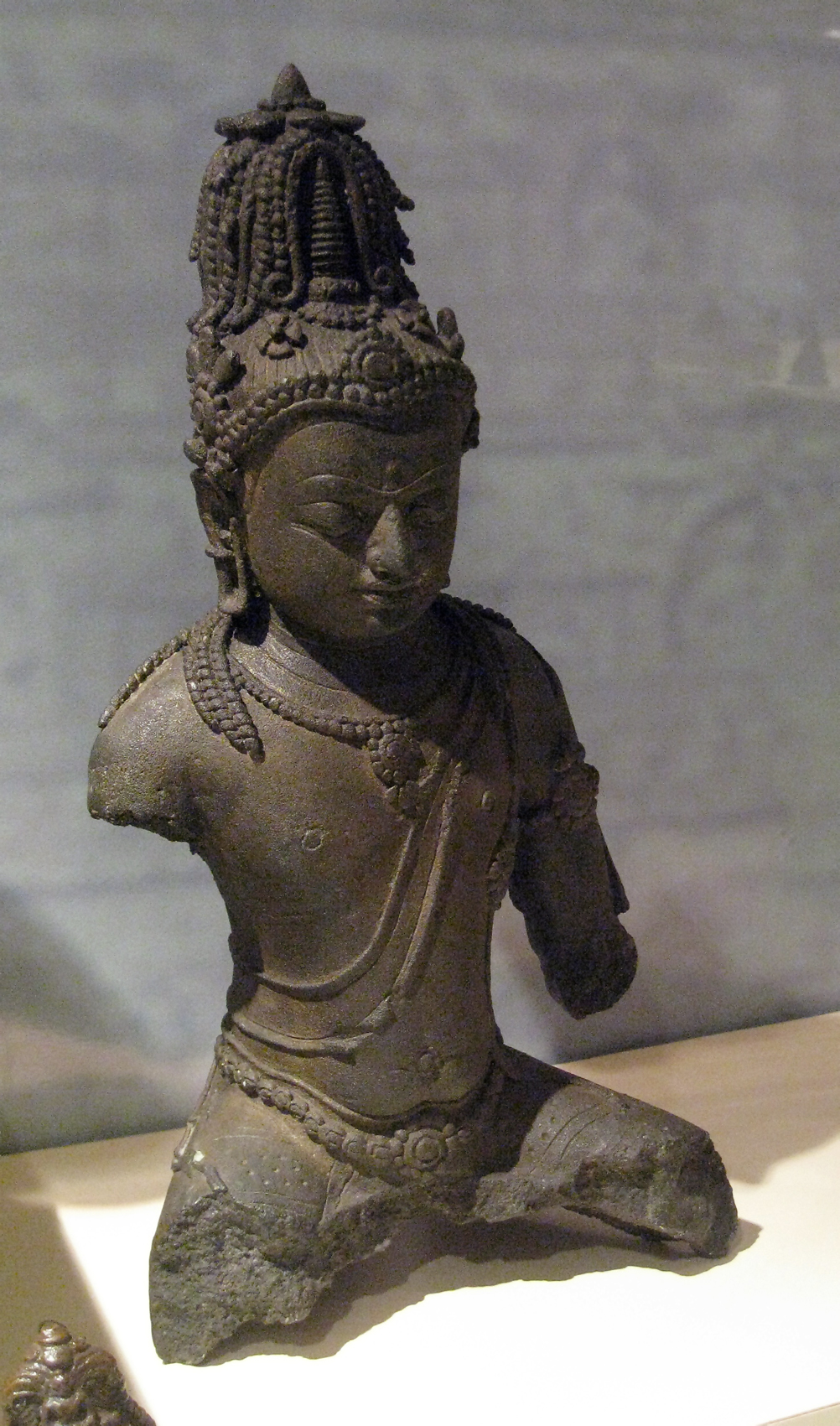
A bronze Maitreya statue from Komering, South Sumatra, 9th century Srivijayan art

Some art was heavily influenced by Buddhism, further spreading religion and ideologies through the trade of art. The Buddhist art and architecture of Srivijaya was influenced by the Indian art of the Gupta Empire and Pala Empire. This is evident in the Indian Amaravati style Buddha statue located in Palembang. This statue, dating back to the 7th or 8th century, is evidence of the spread of art, culture, and ideology through trade. According to various historical sources, a complex and cosmopolitan society with a culture deeply influenced by Vajrayana Buddhism, flourished in the Srivijayan capital. The 7th century Talang Tuwo inscription described Buddhist rituals and blessings at the event of establishing a public park. This inscription allowed historians to understand the practices being held at the time, as well as their importance to the function of Srivijayan society. Talang Tuwo serves as one of the world's oldest inscriptions that talks about the environment, highlighting the centrality of nature in Buddhist religion and Srivijayan society. The Kota Kapur inscription mentions Srivijayan military dominance against Java.

The Old Malay language, the predecessor to the modern Malay language, had been used since the 7th century in the Malay Archipelago as evident by inscriptions in the coastal areas of the archipelago, such as those discovered in Java. The language was spread by traders and become the lingua franca of the archipelago.

Despite its economic, cultural and military advances, Srivijaya left few archaeological remains in their heartlands in Sumatra. Some Buddhist temples dated from Srivijayan era are found in Sumatra and are Muaro Jambi, Muara Takus and Biaro Bahal.

Some Buddhist sculptures, such as Buddha Vairocana, Boddhisattva Avalokiteshvara and Maitreya, were discovered at numerous sites in Sumatra and the Malay Peninsula. These archaeological findings such as the stone statue of Buddha discovered in Bukit Seguntang, Palembang, Avalokiteshvara from Bingin Jungut in Musi Rawas, the bronze Maitreya statue of Komering, all discovered in South Sumatra. In Jambi, a golden statue of Avalokiteshvara was discovered in Rataukapastuo, Muarabulian. In the Malay Peninsula the bronze statue of Avalokiteshvara of Bidor was discovered in Perak, and Avalokiteshvara of Chaiya in Southern Thailand. The difference in material, supports the spread of Buddhism through trade.

Srivijayan-style Mahāyāna sculpture has also been found well north of the peninsula. At U Thong in the central Thai plain, Phasook Indrawooth records a bronze Padmapāṇi 23.5 cm (9.3 in) high, of about the 9th or 10th century. Saritpong Khunsong adds an Avalokiteśvara head from stupa 13 and a Srivijaya-style votive tablet from stupa 15. The finds have been read as Mahāyāna belief reaching Dvaravati culture from Srivijaya between about the 9th and the 11th century. Manop Nakkarnrian and his co-authors note that the bronzes are small, and that travellers from the peninsula may have carried them north as personal possessions.

After the bronze and Iron Age, an influx of bronze tools and jewelry spread throughout the region. The different styles of bangles and beads represent the different regions of origin and their own specific materials and techniques used. Chinese artwork was one of the main items traded in the region, spreading art styles enveloped in ceramics, pottery, fabrics, silk, and artwork.

=== Religion ===
"...Many kings and chieftains in the islands of the Southern Ocean admire and believe (Buddhism), and their hearts are set on accumulating good actions. In the fortified city of Bhoga [Palembang, Srivijaya's capital] Buddhist priests number more than 1,000, whose minds are bent on learning and good practices. They investigate and study all the subjects that exist just as in the Middle Kingdom (Madhya-desa, India); the rules and ceremonies are not at all different. If a Chinese priest wishes to go to the West in order to hear (lectures) and read (the original), he had better stay here one or two years and practise the proper rules and then proceed to Central India."

— from Yijing's A Record of Buddhist Practices Sent Home from the Southern Sea.

Remnants of Buddhist shrines (stupas) near Palembang and neighboring areas aid researchers in their understanding of the Buddhism within this society. Srivijaya and its kings were instrumental in the spread of Buddhism as they established it in places they conquered like Java and Malaya. People making pilgrimages were encouraged to spend time with the monks in the capital city of Palembang on their journey to India.

On the upper Thai peninsula the pattern is more mixed. Phanuwat Ueasaman's inventory of 26 sites in six provinces records 11 hill temples and 15 caves, and finds that Hindu communities held hilltops over long periods while Buddhists more often deposited votive tablets in caves already in use. At Khao Si Wichai in Phun Phin, Shaiva, Vaishnava and Mahayana buildings stood on one hill; thermoluminescence dates its brick monuments to 809, 939 and 985, and a fourth to 840 by radiocarbon.

Other than Palembang, three Srivijayan archaeological sites in Sumatra are notable for their Buddhist temple density. They are Muaro Jambi by the bank of the Batang Hari River in Jambi province; Muara Takus stupas in the Kampar River valley of Riau province; and Biaro Bahal temple compound in the Barumun and Pannai river valleys, North Sumatra province. It is highly possible that these Buddhist sites served as sangha community; the monastic Buddhist learning centres of the region.

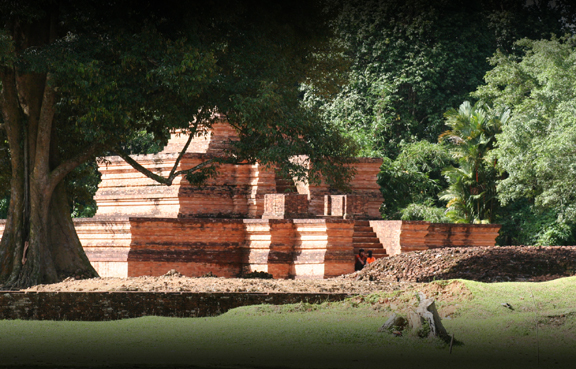
Candi Tinggi, one of the temples within Muaro Jambi temple compound

In the 5th century, the Chinese monk Faxian visited the region. 250 years later, the monk Yijing stayed in Srivijaya for six months and studied Sanskrit. According to Yijing, within Palembang there were more than 1,000 monks studying for themselves and training traveling scholars who were going from India to China and vice versa. Most of these travelers stayed in Palembang for long periods of time to wait for Monsoon winds to help further their journey.

A stronghold of Vajrayana Buddhism, Srivijaya attracted pilgrims and scholars from other parts of Asia. These included the Chinese monk Yijing, who made several lengthy visits to Sumatra on his way to study at Nalanda University in India in 671 and 695, and the 11th century Bengali Buddhist scholar Atisha, who played a major role in the development of Vajrayana Buddhism in Tibet. Yijing and other monks of his time practiced a pure version of Buddhism although the religion allowed for cultural changes to be made. He is also given credit for translating Buddhist text which has the most instructions on the discipline of the religion. Yijing wrote his memoir of Buddhism whilst in Srivijaya. Travellers to these islands mentioned that gold coins were in use in the coastal areas but not inland. Srivijaya drew in priests from as far away as Korea.

A notable Srivijayan and revered Buddhist scholar was Dharmakirti who taught Buddhist philosophy in Srivijaya and Nalanda. The language diction of many inscriptions found near where Srivijaya once reigned incorporated Indian Tantric conceptions. This evidence makes it clear the relationship of the ruler and the concept of bodhisattva—one who was to become a Buddha. This is the first evidence seen in the archaeological record of a Southeast Asian ruler regarded as a religious leader/figure.

One thing researchers have found Srivijaya to be lacking is an emphasis in art and architecture. While neighboring regions have evidence of intricate architecture, Palembang lacks Buddhist stupas or sculptures.

Hinduism was also practiced in Srivijaya. This is based on the discovery of the Bumiayu temple ruin, a red brick Shivaist Hindu temple compound built and used between the 8th and 13th century. The Bumiayu temple site is located by the banks of the Lematang River, a tributary of the Musi River. This temple compound was probably built by a Kedatuan within Srivijaya's mandala. The fact that a Hindu temple was discovered within the area of predominantly Buddhist Srivijaya suggests that Srivijaya's two religious groups coexisted quite harmoniously.

According to the styles of Shiva and Agastya statues found in Bumiayu temple 1, those Hindu statues are dated from around the 9th to 10th-century. By the 12th to 13th-century it seems that the faith in Bumiayu was shifted from Hinduism to Tantric Buddhism.

== Relations with regional powers ==
Although historical records and archaeological evidence are scarce, it appears that by the 7th century, Srivijaya had established suzerainty over large areas of Sumatra, western Java and much of the Malay Peninsula. Initially, Srivijaya dominated a confederation of semi-autonomous port cities in the region, through nurturing alliances and gaining fealty among these polities. Regarding its status as the central port of the region, it seems that Srivijaya had a unique "ritual policy" in its relations with the dominant powers of South Asia, Southeast Asia, and China.

The oldest accounts of the empire come from Arabic and Chinese traders who noted in their travel logs of the importance of the empire in regional trade. Its location was instrumental in developing itself as a major port which connected China, the Middle East and Southeast Asia. Control of the Malacca and Sunda Straits meant it controlled both the spice route traffic as well as local trade, charging a toll on passing ships. Serving as an entrepôt for Chinese, Malay, and Indian markets, the port of Palembang, accessible from the coast by way of a river, accumulated great wealth. Instead of traveling the entire distance from the Middle East to China, which would have taken about a year with the assistance of monsoon winds, it was easier to stop at Srivijaya. It took about half a year from either direction to reach Srivijaya which was a far more effective and efficient use of manpower and resources. A round trip from one end to Srivijaya and back would take the same amount of time to go the entire distance one way. This theory has been supported by evidence found in two local shipwrecks. One off the coast of Belitung, an island east of Sumatra, and another near Cirebon, a coastal city on the nearby island of Java. Both ships carried a variety of foreign cargo and, in the case of the Belitung wreck, had foreign origins.

The Melayu Kingdom was the first rival power centre absorbed into the empire, and thus began the domination of the region through trade and conquest in the 7th through the 9th centuries. The Melayu Kingdom's gold mines in the Batang Hari River hinterland were a crucial economic resource and may be the origin of the word Suvarnadvipa, the Sanskrit name for Sumatra. Srivijaya helped spread Malay culture throughout Sumatra, the Malay Peninsula, and western Borneo. Its influence waned in the 11th century.

Some historians claim that Chaiya in Surat Thani province in southern Thailand was, at least temporarily, the capital of Srivijaya, but this claim is widely disputed. However, Chaiya was probably a regional centre of the kingdom.

Srivijaya also maintained close relations with the Pala Empire in Bengal. The Nalanda inscription, dated 860, records that Maharaja Balaputra dedicated a monastery at the Nalanda university in Pala. The relation between Srivijaya and the Chola dynasty of southern India was initially friendly during the reign of Raja Raja Chola I. In 1006, a Srivijayan Maharaja from the Sailendra dynasty, king Maravijayattungavarman, constructed the Chudamani Vihara in the port town of Nagapattinam. However, during the reign of Rajendra Chola I the relationship deteriorated as the Chola dynasty started to attack Srivijayan cities.

The reason for this sudden change in the relationship with the Chola kingdom is not fully known. However, as some historians suggest, that the Khmer king, Suryavarman I of the Khmer Empire, had requested aid from Emperor Rajendra Chola I of the Chola dynasty against Tambralinga. After learning of Suryavarman's alliance with Rajendra Chola, the Tambralinga kingdom requested aid from the Srivijaya king, Sangrama Vijayatungavarman. This eventually led to the Chola Empire coming into conflict with Srivijaya. The conflict ended with a victory for the Chola and heavy losses for Srivijaya and the capture of Sangramavijayottungavarman in the Chola raid in 1025. During the reign of Kulothunga Chola I, Srivijaya sent an embassy to the Chola dynasty.

== Legacy ==
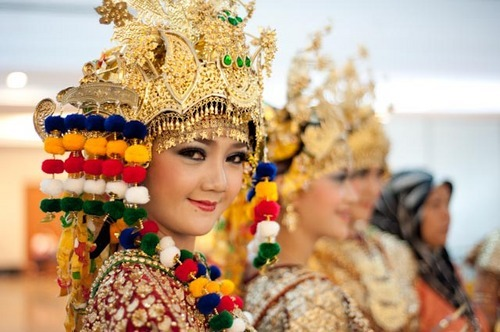
The gilded costume of South Sumatran Gending Sriwijaya dance.

Although Srivijaya left few archaeological remains and was almost forgotten in the collective memory of Maritime Southeast Asia, the rediscovery of this ancient maritime empire by Cœdès in the 1920s raised the notion that it was possible for a widespread political entity to have thrived in Southeast Asia in the past. Modern Indonesian historians have used Srivijaya as a frame of reference of how ancient globalisation, foreign relations and maritime trade, have shaped Asian civilisation. The royal style itself travelled. Walailak Songsiri derives the second element of the place-name Phraek Si Racha, an old town on the Noi River in what is now Chai Nat province, from Sri Maharaja, the style of a prestigious Srivijayan king, taken up as a place-name in the way that peninsular and Khmer royal names were taken up as titles in the central plain of Thailand.

An important legacy of Srivijaya was its language. Unlike some inscriptions of Srivijayan contemporaries — Tarumanagara and other Javanese polities that use Sanskrit — Srivijayan inscriptions were written in Old Malay. This has promoted the status of local languages to the same status as Sanskrit; as the language of the elite. Sanskrit was only known in certain circles such as the brahmin and kavi, while Old Malay was a common language in the Srivijayan realm. This linguistic policy probably stemmed from the rather egalitarian nature of Mahayana Buddhism adhered to in Srivijaya, in contrast to the elitist nature of Hinduism. Unlike Hinduism, Mahayana Buddhism did not have emphasize on a caste system that limited the use and knowledge of liturgical language to the Brahmin caste. For centuries, Srivijaya, through its expansion, economic power and military prowess, was responsible for the spread of Old Malay throughout the Malay Archipelago. It was the working language of traders, being used in various ports and marketplaces in the region.

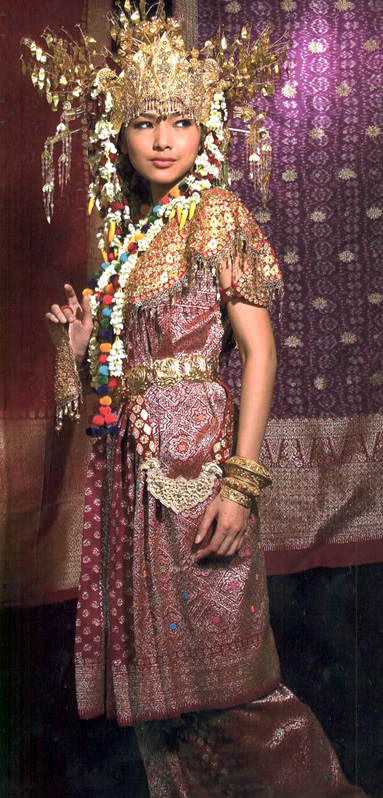
Gilded songket in Palembang Aesan Gede wedding costume, South Sumatra.

Today, in Indonesian artistic tradition, songket weaving art is strongly associated with Palembang, and to a certain extent West Sumatra and Jambi. This has motivated Indonesian historians to trace the origin of songket and its possible link to Srivijaya. Based on an archaeological study on the Bumiayu temple complex in Penukal Abab Lematang Ilir Regency, South Sumatra, it can be seen that songket has been known by the people of South Sumatra since the 9th century. A textile motif known today in Palembang songket as lepus can be seen on the vest worn by Figure 1 statue at the Bumiayu temple complex, which suggests that the motif that has been around since the 9th century. This archaeological study has enforced the notion that songket gold thread weaving tradition originated in Srivijaya.

Modern Indonesian nationalists have used the name of Srivijaya, along with Majapahit, as a source of pride. Srivijaya has become the focus of national pride and regional identity, especially for the people of Palembang, South Sumatra. For the people of Palembang, Srivijaya has become a source of artistic inspiration for Gending Sriwijaya song and traditional dance.

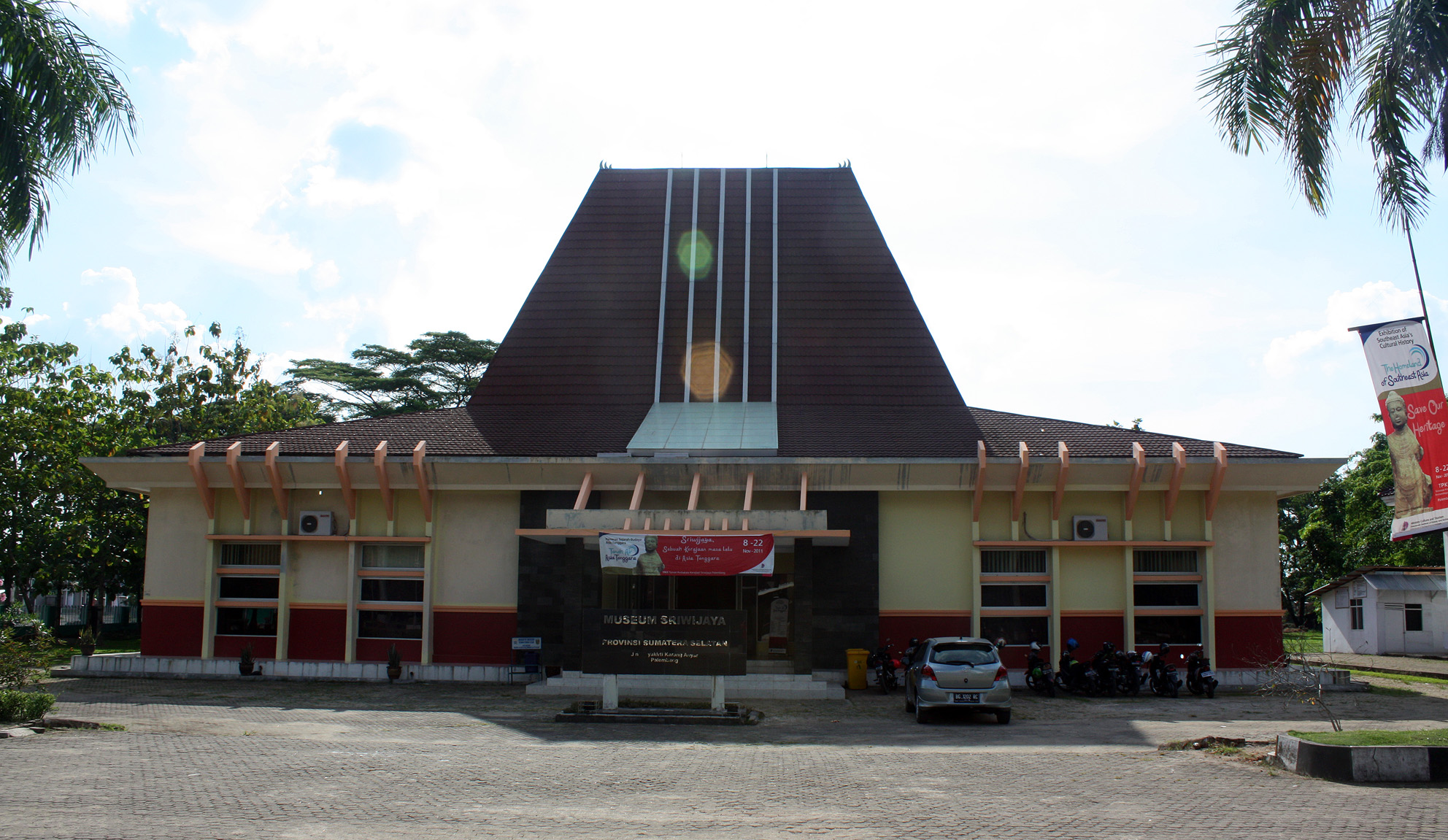
The Sriwijaya Museum in Srivijaya Archaeological Park

Srivijaya is a street name in many cities in Indonesia and has become synonymous with Palembang and South Sumatra. Srivijaya University, established in 1960 in Palembang, was named after Srivijaya. Kodam II/Sriwijaya (an army regional military command), KRI Sriwijaya (an aircraft carrier of the Indonesian Navy), Pupuk Sriwidjaja Palembang (a fertiliser company), Sriwijaya Post (a Palembang-based newspaper), Sriwijaya Air (an airline), Gelora Sriwijaya Stadium, and Sriwijaya F.C. (Palembang football club) were also all named after Srivijaya. On 11 November 2011, during the opening ceremony of 2011 Southeast Asian Games in Gelora Sriwijaya Stadium, Palembang, a colossal dance performance titled "Srivijaya the Golden Peninsula" was performed featuring Palembang traditional dances and a life-sized replica of an ancient ship. In popular culture, Srivijaya has become the source of inspiration for numbers of fictional feature films, novels and comic books. For example, the 2013 film Gending Sriwijaya, took place three centuries after the fall of Srivijaya, telling a story about court intrigue amidst the efforts to revive the fallen empire.

== List of kings ==
Date	Name	Capital	Stone inscription or embassies to China and events
683	Dapunta Hyang Sri Jayanasa	Srivijaya	Kedukan Bukit (683), Talang Tuwo (684), and Kota Kapur (686) inscriptions Malayu conquest, expedition to Bhumi Jawa (result unknown)
702	Sri Indravarman Che-li-t'o-lo-pa-mo	Srivijaya Shih-li-fo-shih	Chinese embassies 702, 716 and 724 Embassies to Caliph Mu'awiya I and Caliph Umar ibn Abd al-Aziz
728	Rudra Vikrama Liu-t'eng-wei-kung	Srivijaya Shih-li-fo-shih	Chinese embassies 728 and 742
No information 742–775
775	Dharmasetu or Vishnu	Unknown (under Javanese Sailendra dynasty overlordship)	Nakhon Si Thammarat (Ligor), Vat Sema Muang
775	Dharanindra	Unknown (under Javanese Sailendra dynasty overlordship)	Ligor, started to build Borobudur in 770 Conquered South Cambodia
782	Samaragrawira	Unknown (under Javanese Sailendra dynasty overlordship)	Ligor, Arabian text (790), continued the construction of Borobudur
792	Samaratungga	Unknown (under Javanese Sailendra dynasty overlordship)	Karangtengah inscription (824), 802 lost Cambodia, 825 completion of Borobudur
835	Balaputradewa	Srivijaya San-fo-ts'i	Ousted from Java Nalanda inscription (860)
No information 835–960
960	Sri Udayadityavarman Si-li-Hu-ta-hsia-li-tan Shih-li Wu-yeh	Srivijaya San-fo-ts'i	Chinese embassies 960 and 962
980	Haji Hsia-ch'ih	Srivijaya San-fo-ts'i	Chinese embassies 980 and 983
988	Sri Cudamani Warmadewa Se-li-chu-la-wu-ni-fu-ma-tian-hwa	Srivijaya San-fo-ts'i	Chinese embassies 988, 992, 1003 and 1004 Javanese King Dharmawangsa attack of Srivijaya, building of a temple for the Chinese Emperor, Tanjore Inscription or Leiden Inscription (1044), building of a temple at Nagapattinam with revenue from Rajaraja Chola I
1006, 1008	Sri Maravijayottungavarman Se-li-ma-la-pi	Srivijaya San-fo-ts'i	Constructed the Chudamani Vihara in Nagapattinam, India in 1006. Chinese embassies 1008 and 1016
1017	Haji Sumatrabhumi Ha-ch'i-su-wa-ch'a-p'u	Srivijaya San-fo-ts'i	Chinese embassy 1017
1025	Sangrama Vijayatunggavarman	Srivijaya San-fo-ts'i	Chola invasion of Srivijaya, captured by Rajendra Chola Chola inscription on the temple of Rajaraja, Tanjore
1028	Sri Deva Shih-li Tieh-hua	Srivijaya San-fo-ts'i	Chinese embassy 1028

== Works cited ==
- Munoz, Paul Michel (2006). Early Kingdoms of the Indonesian Archipelago and the Malay Peninsula. Singapore: Editions Didier Millet. ISBN 981-4155-67-5.
