= Kantoli =

Ancient kingdom in Sumatra

Kantoli was an ancient kingdom suspected to be located somewhere between Jambi and Palembang in southern Sumatra around the 5th century of the common era. The Sanskrit name for this polity is Kuntala. Chinese records indicate that "Sanfotsi was formerly called Kantoli" and this as well as the location of the kingdom have led historians to consider Kantoli as the predecessor of Srivijaya. Srivijaya was referred to as Sanfotsi by the Chinese.

During the reign of the Liu Song dynasty in south China, Kantoli sent several embassies to China. Trade between the two kingdoms were established and this granted Kantoli with great wealth through heavy dependency on volume from China. With the conquest of south China by the Sui dynasty, volume of trade dwindled due to the new ruler's austerity. The emperor banned all luxurious items in the courts which coincidentally were supplied by many, including Kantoli.

Sri Varanarendra, king of Kan-t'o-li, sent the Hindu Rudra on an embassy to China between 454 and 464. His son, Vijayavarman, did the same in 519.

== Origins ==
According to S.Sartono (1992), there were difficulties for merchant ships to dock at the port of Muara Tebo as a result of siltation in the bay. As a result, the port could no longer function as an ocean port. Koying State, the ruler of the Wen Bay region, was thus forced to move the trading port to the East Coast of what is now the Kuala Tungkal area.

Ultimately, Koying State released the east coast area and encouraged the formation of a new government called Kantoli (Kuntal). This occurred around the 5th century of the common era. Following the formation of Kantoli, the new kingdom maintained good relations with Koying.

== See also ==
- History of Indonesia
