= Haji Sumatrabhumi =

King of the Srivijaya empire

Haji Sumatrabhumi (meaning "King of the land of Sumatra") was a king of the Srivijaya Kingdom who sent envoys to the Chinese Song dynasty in 1017. His name is recorded in Li Tao's Xu Zizhi Tongjian Changbian as Xiachi Suwuzhapumi (霞遲蘇勿吒蒲迷; Baxter's transcription for Middle Chinese: Hae-drij Su-mjut-traeH-phuX-mi). The title "Haji" was generally a denomination for a vassal king.

The envoys sent by Haji Sumatrabhumi brought gold-inscribed letter, with offerings of pearls, ivory, Sanskrit religious books, and slaves. Emperor Zhenzong of Song was very pleased with them, and allowed the envoys to see the royal buildings, before sending them back with a reply letter and various other gifts.

During his reign, Srivijaya was thought to have sustained attacks from Chola Kingdom, which peaked in 1025 under the leadership of King Rajendra I. This event was recorded in the Tanjore inscription. The Srivijayan ruler after him was Sangrama Vijayatunggavarman, who was captured by the Chola forces in their attack on Kedah (Kadaram), one of Srivijaya's territories.

== See also ==
- Srivijaya
- Sangrama Vijayatunggavarman
- Tamil inscriptions in the Malay world
