= Rudra Vikrama =

Rudra Vikrama (or maybe Rudravarman) was an 8th-century king of Srivijaya Kingdom who sent two emissaries to China, first one in 728 CE and the second one in 742 CE. His name was recorded in the chronicle New Book of Tang (Xīn Tángshū) as Liu-t'eng-wei-kung, and his royal title was Ho-mi-to which could be the Sanskrit word Amrta ("immortal").

During his reign, it was assumed that Srivijaya continued its northern expansion along the Malacca Strait and the southeastern one around the Sunda Strait, to ensure its trade hegemony.
