= History of Sunda Kingdom =

Origin of Sunda Kingdom

The history of Sunda Kingdom spanned almost a millennium, between 7th to 16th century. It is not sure however, whether the Sunda Kingdom was actually a continuous polity or not, nor whether its rulers belongs to a single continuous lineage of dynasty or not. This is because the scarcity of evidences, historical records and archaeological findings that plausibly connected to this kingdom.

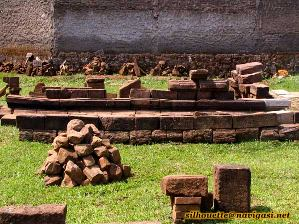
The ruin of Bojongmenje Hindu temple in Priangan highlands, estimated was built in the 7th century.

One of the few remnant is the 7th century Bojongmenje Hindu temple near Bandung that was discovered in 2002. It was one of the earliest temple structure in Java, older than temples of Dieng in Central Java, and possibly linked to the Sunda Kingdom.

The earlier period is unclear, and quite speculative at its best. Much owed to only two manuscripts dated from much later period, the Carita Parahyangan and Wangsakerta manuscripts. The history of later period however, after the late 14th century, is quite clear. Especially after the reign of King Wastu Kancana and Jayadewata (Sri Baduga Maharaja). This is contributed mainly to the availability of historical sources, including numbers of foreign reports, especially Portuguese Suma Oriental; several stone inscriptions especially Batutulis; and native primary historical manuscripts of Bujangga Manik and Sanghyang Siksakanda ng Karesian.

== Location ==
Sunda Kingdom, located of western parts of Java island.

Sunda kingdom located in western parts of Java, which today corresponds with the Indonesian provinces of West Java, Jakarta and Banten. West Java was one of the first contact points in Indonesia for Indian traders and their cultural influences. This important geographical fact is not a coincidence, as west Java was an important turning point of maritime trade route connecting India with China via Maritime Silk Road. West Java also Southern Sumatra are located on the edge of southern coasts, a landfall when one vessel sailing from coastal Southern China to the south. From there the voyage turned west towards Sumatra, through Malacca strait and crossing Bay of Bengal to India. As a matter of fact, centuries later, it was here that the Dutch and British first set foot in the archipelago. Previously, the Hindu Tarumanagara kingdom was flourished in the same location, which widely regarded as the predecessor of Sunda Kingdom.

== Historiography ==
Knowledge of the kingdom among Sundanese people has been kept alive through Sundanese Pantun oral tradition, the chant of poetic verses about the golden age of Sunda Pajajaran, and the legend of Prabu Siliwangi, the most popular king of Sunda.

Several stone inscriptions mention the kingdom, such as Juru Pangambat, Jayabupati, Kawali, and Batutulis. Most account and records of the Sunda Kingdom came from manuscripts dated from a later period circa 15th to 16th century, such as Bujangga Manik, Sanghyang Siksakanda ng Karesian, Carita Parahyangan, and Kidung Sunda.

The history of Sunda Kingdom is also recorded in Pustaka Rajyarajya i Bhumi Nusantara, a book within the Wangsakerta manuscript, composed in the late 17th century in Cirebon. However, currently the Wangsakerta manuscript is generally discounted as a valid historical source among historians as it is suspected to be fraudulent.

=== Local account ===
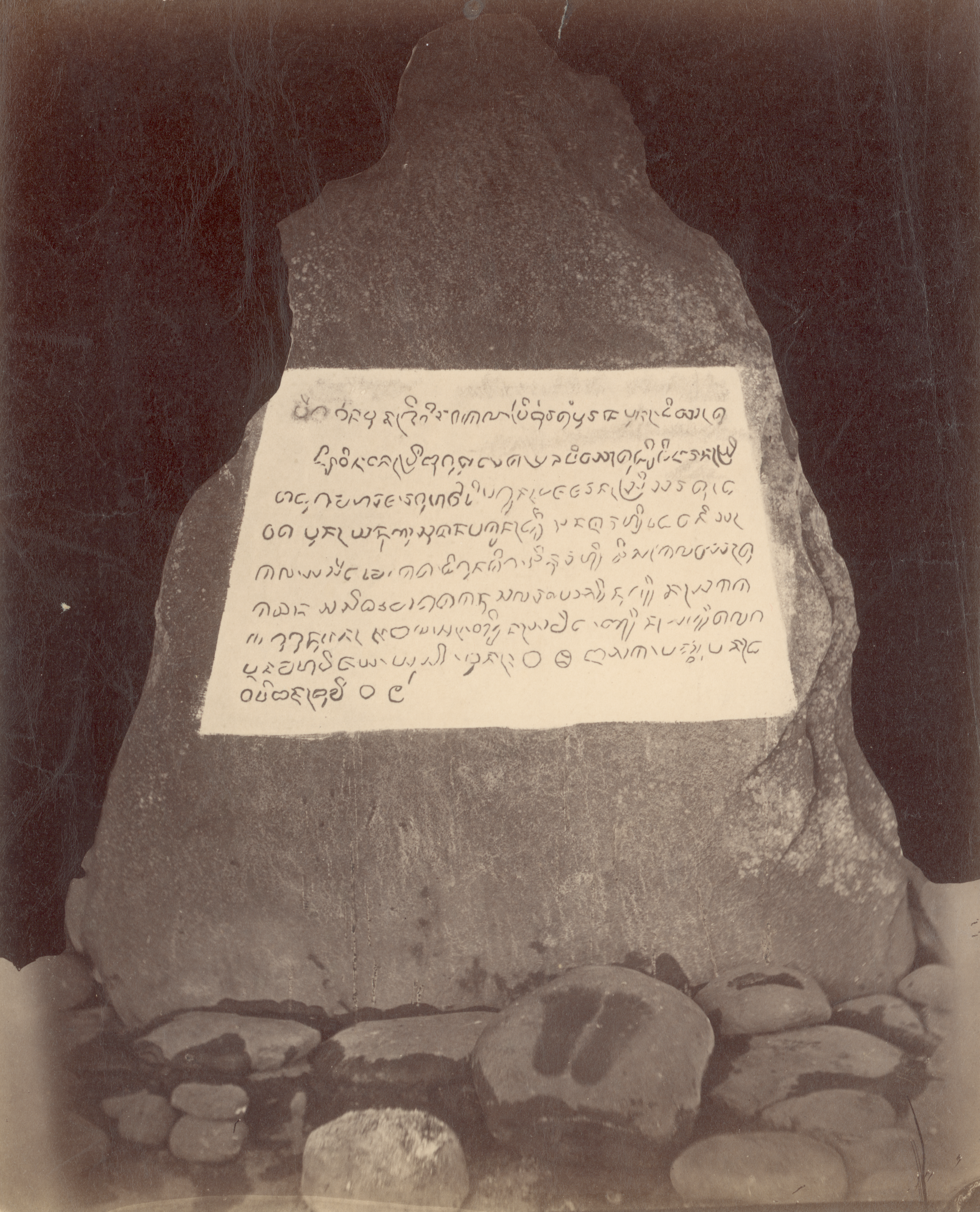
Batutulis inscription (dated 1533), in Bogor, commemorate the great King of Sunda Sri Baduga Maharaja (rule 1482–1521).

The earliest reference to the name "Sunda" being used to identify a kingdom is the Kebon Kopi II inscription dated 854 Saka (932 AD). The inscription was in old Javanese script, but the language used was Old Malay. It translates as follows:

This memorial stone is to remark the saying of Rakryan Juru Pangambat (Royal Hunter), in 854 Saka, that the order of government is returned to the power of king of Sunda.

The inscription chandrasengkala (chronogram) written 458 Saka, however some historians suggested that the year of the inscription must be read backward as 854 Saka (932 AD) because the Sunda kingdom could not have existed in 536 AD, in the era of the Kingdom of Tarumanagara (358-669 AD).

Another reference to the kingdom is the Jayabupati inscription which consists of 40 lines written on four pieces of stone found on the Cicatih river bank in Cibadak, Sukabumi. The inscription is written in old Javanese script. The four inscriptions are now stored at the National Museum in Jakarta, under the codes D 73 (Cicatih), D 96, D 97 and D 98. The contents of the inscriptions (according to Pleyte):

Peace and well-being. In the year of Saka 952 (1030 AD), Kartika month on the 12th day on the light part, Hariang day, Kaliwon, first day, Wuku Tambir. Today is the day that king of Sunda Maharaja Sri Jayabupati Jayamanahen Wisnumurti Samarawijaya Sakalabuwanamandaleswaranindita Haro Gowardhana Wikramottunggadewa, makes his marks on eastern part of this Sanghiyang Tapak (insribed stone). Made by Sri Jayabupati King of Sunda. And may there be nobody allowed to break this law. In this part of river catching fish is forbidden, in the sacred area of Sanghyang Tapak near the source of the river. Up until the border of sacred Sanghyang Tapak marked by two big tree. So this inscriptions is made, enforced with an oath. Whoever breaks the law will be punished by these supranatural beings, die in horrible way like their brain being sucked, blood being drunk, intestines being destroyed, and chest is split in two. O being known by thee.., all the spirits.

The date of the Jayabupati inscription may be 11 October 1030. According to Pustaka Nusantara, Parwa III sarga 1, Sri Jayabupati reigned for 12 years, from 952 to 964 saka (1030 - 1042 AD). The inscription has an East Javanese style in lettering, language, and style, and mentions the current king by name.

Copperplate letters dating to the 15th century, including royal instructions, also imply the existence of the Sunda Kingdom. The copperplate inscription of Kebantenan I (Jayagiri) reads that Raja Rahyang Niskala Wastu Kancana sent an order through Hyang Ningrat Kancana to the Susuhunan of Pakuan Pajajaran to take care of dayohan in Jayagiri and Sunda Sembawa, banning the collection of collecting taxes from the residents because they were knowledgeable about the (Hindu) religion and worshiped the gods.

Kebantenan II inscription (Sunda Sembawa I) copperplate inscription announces Sri Baduga Maharaja (1482–1521), the king staying in Pakuan, approving an already delineated sacred estate (tanah devasasana) put at the disposal of the wiku (priests), which must not be split as it houses facilities for worship, which belong to the king. Kebantenan III inscription (Sunda Sembawa II) copperplate announces the king of Sunda's sanctions of holy construction in Sunda Sembawa. The Kebantenan IV (Gunung Samaya) inscription says that Sri Baduga Maharaja, who ruled in Pakuan, sanctioned a sacred place (tanah devasana) at Gunung (mount) Samya (Rancamaya), the mentions a similar sacred estate to the one described in the Kebantenan II inscription.

The primary source that contains information about the daily life of late 15th to early 16th century Sunda Kingdom was found in Bujangga Manik manuscript. The names of places, culture and customs, was described in great detail, it is one of the important specimen of Old Sundanese literature. The main character is Prince Jaya Pakuan alias Bujangga Manik, a Sundanese Hindu hermit, who, though a prince at the court of Pakuan Pajajaran, preferred to live a life of a man of religion. As a hermit he made two journeys from Pakuan Pajajaran to central and eastern Java and back, the second one including a visit to Bali. After his return he practised asceticism on a mountain in western Java, where his bodily existence came to an end.

The manuscript dated from pre-Islamic Sunda. The language represents an older stage of Sundanese. It displays a marked influence from Javanese but does not contain one word which is traceable to Arabic. In the content of the story, too, Islam is completely absent. This manuscript specifically the mention of Majapahit, Malacca and Demak allow us to date the writing of the story in the 15th century, probably the later part of this century, or the early 16th century at the latest.

=== Chinese account ===
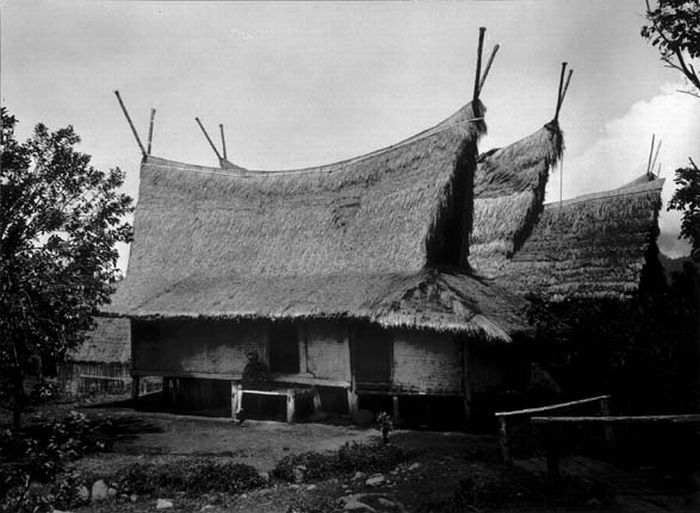
Sundanese traditional house with Julang Ngapak roof in Garut circa 1920s. It was built on poles and having thatched roof, as described in a 12th century Chinese source.

According to F. Hirt and W. W. Rockhill, there are Chinese sources concerning the Sunda Kingdom. At the time of the Southern Sung dynasty, the inspector of trade with foreign countries, Chau Ju-kua, collected reports from sailors and merchants who had visited foreign countries. His report on far countries, Chu-fan-chi, written from 1178 to 1225 AD, mentions the deepwater harbour of Sin-t’o (Sunda). Chu-fan-chi reported that:

All along the shores, people are dwelling. The people are working in agriculture, their houses are on poles and the roofs are thatched with the bark of the leaves of palm trees and the walls were made with wooden boards tied together with rattan. Both men and women wrap round their loins a piece of cotton, and in cutting their hair they only leave it half an inch long. The pepper grown on the hills (of this country) is small-grained, but heavy and superior to that of Ta-pan (eastern Java). The country produces pumpkins, sugar cane, bottle gourd, beans and egg plants. As, however, there is no regular government in this country, the people are given to brigandage, on which account foreign traders rarely go there.

According to this source, the kingdom of Sunda produced high quality black pepper. The kingdom located in the western parts of Java near Sunda Strait, corresponds to today Banten, Jakarta and west part of West Java province. According to this source, the port of Sunda was under Srivijaya mandala domination. Port of Sunda was highly possible refer to port of Banten instead of Kalapa. Its capital is located 10 kilometres inland southward in Banten Girang near Mount Pulosari.

The Chinese book “shun-feng hsiang-sung" from about 1430 AD relates:

In this voyage eastward from Sunda, along the north coast of Java, ships steered 97 1/2o for three watches to make Kalapa; they then followed the coast (past Tanjung Indramayu), finally steering 187 1/2o for four watches to reach Cirebon. Ships from Banten proceeded eastward along the north coast of Java, past Kalapa, past Indramayu head, past Cirebon.

According to this source the port of Sunda was located west of Kalapa and later identified as port of Banten.

=== European account ===
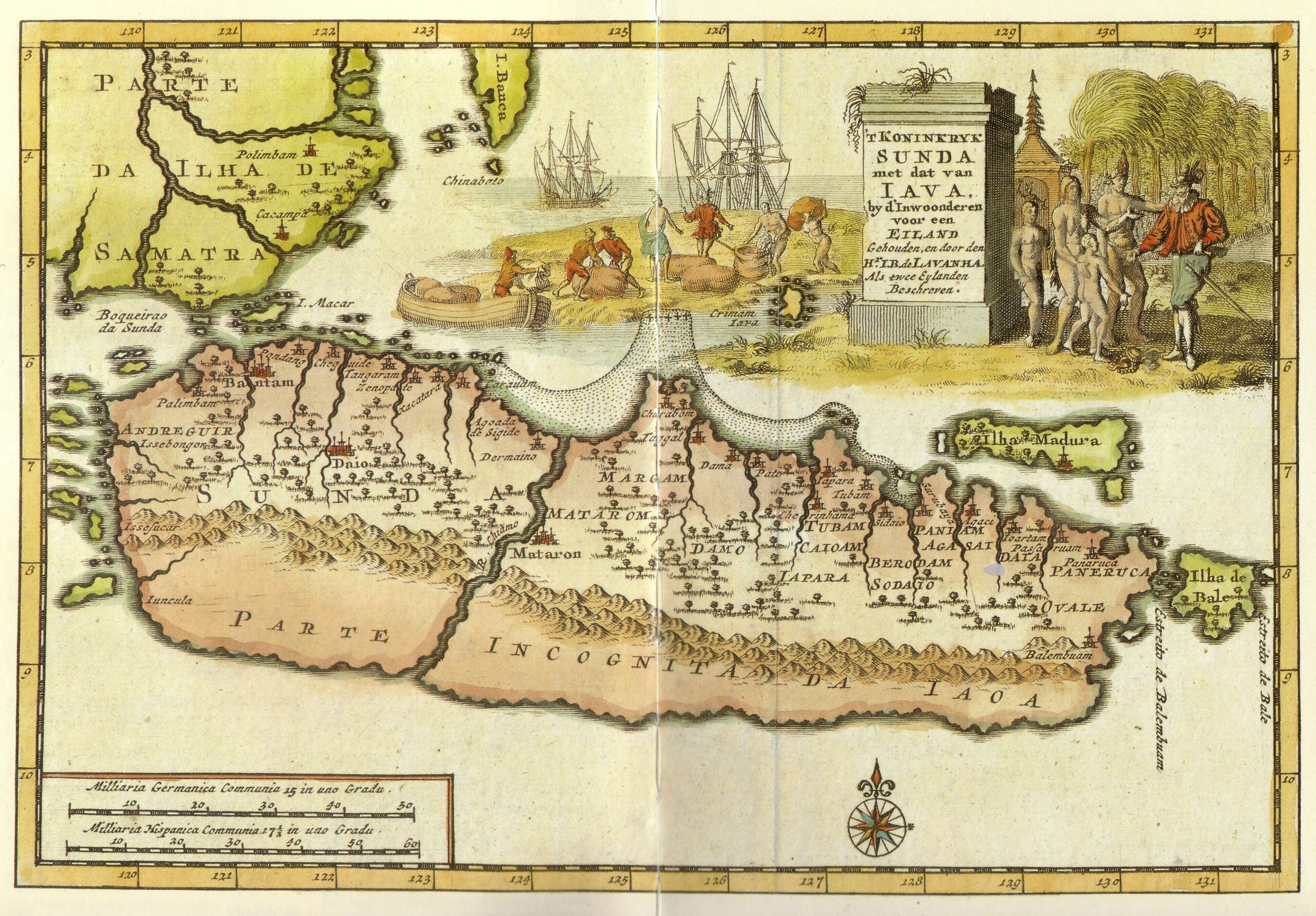
Old map of Java still thought that land of Sunda in the west is separated with the rest of Java island. Here the capital of Sunda is called Daio which refer to Dayeuh Pakuan Pajajaran

European explorers, mainly Portuguese based in Malacca, also reported the existence of the Sunda Kingdom. Tomé Pires (1513) mentioned a Western Java kingdom that had established trade relation with them as ... Regño de Çumda ..., which means "The Kingdom of Sunda". Also the report of Antonio Pigafetta (1522) that mentioned Sunda as a pepper producing region.

Tomé Pires from Portugal wrote in his report “Summa Oriental (1513–1515)”:

Some people affirm that the Sunda kingdom take up half of the whole island of Java; others, to whom more authority is attributed, say that the Sunda kingdom must be a third part of the island and an eight more. It ends at the river chi Manuk. The river intersects the whole island from sea to sea in such away that when the people of Java describe their own country, they say that it is bounded to the west by island of Sunda. The people hold that whoever passes this strait (the river Cimanuk) into the South Sea is carried off by violent currents and unable to return.

The Portuguese report is dated from a later period of the kingdom, shortly before its fall to forces of the Sultanate of Banten.

== Formation and growth ==
According to the Wangsakerta manuscript, King Tarusbawa from Sunda Sambawa, a vassal kingdom of Tarumanagara, succeeded his father-in-law as the 13th king of Tarumanagara. Tarumanagara's prestige and power had been declining, likely due to a series of invasions from Srivijaya. Wishing to restore the glory of King Purnawarman, who reigned from the Purasaba (capital city) of Sundapura, in 670 AD Tarusbawa renamed Tarumanagara to the Sunda Kingdom. This event is confirmed by a Tang Chinese source mentioning Tarumanagara's last envoy was in 669 AD. Tarusbawa sent his emissary to the Chinese Emperor at the time to advise him of his ascension to the throne in 669 AD. He was crowned on the ninth of the month of Jyesta, in 591 Saka, which corresponds to 18 May 669 AD.

=== Separation of Galuh and Sunda Kingdom ===
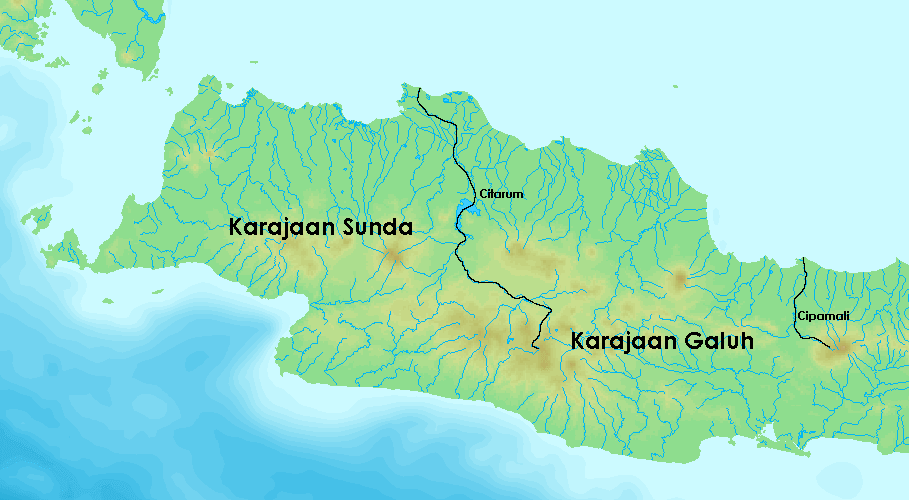
Citarum River separates Sunda and Galuh

According to the Wangsakerta manuscript, Wretikandayun, the lord of another former vassal kingdom of Tarumanagara, Galuh Kingdom, used the establishment of the Sunda Kingdom as an excuse to split eastern Taruma from Tarusbawa's Sunda. Since the crown prince of Galuh was the son-in-law of Queen Shima of Kalingga, a Hindu kingdom in central Java, Wretikandayun, supported by Kalingga, demanded that the remnant of what was known as Tarumanagara's territory be divided into two kingdoms. Finding himself in an unfortunate position and unwilling to risk a civil war, King Tarusbawa granted Wretikandayun's demand. In 670 AD, Tarumanagara was divided into two kingdoms: the Sunda Kingdom in the west, and the Galuh Kingdom in the east, separated by the Tarum (Citarum) River.

=== Sanna and Purbasora ===
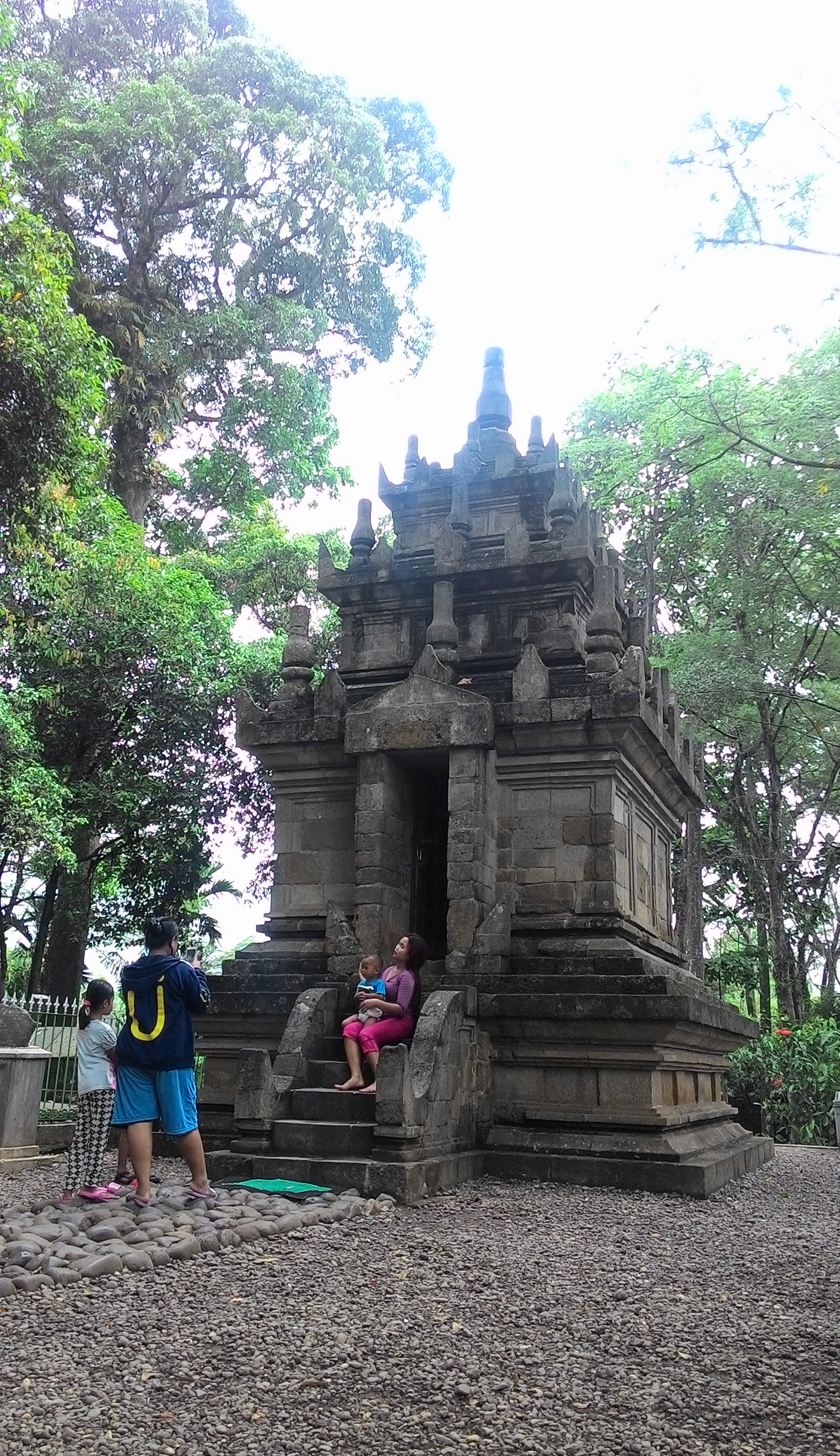
Cangkuang Hindu temple a shrine for Shiva, dated from the 8th century Galuh Kingdom.

Wretikandayun, the King of Galuh has two sons; Sempakwaja and Mandiminyak. Despite being the eldest son, Sempakwaja was not chosen as the successor because he was toothless, a shameful physical defect considered unsuitable for a king at that time. Thus, his younger brother, Mandiminyak (r. 702–709) inherited the Galuh throne from Wretikandayun instead. Sempakwaja then established a rural principality of Galunggung Kingdom.

Sempakwaja has a son named Purbasora, while King Mandiminyak also has a son named Sena or Bratasena. However, there was a circulating rumours in the palace; that actually instead of cousins; Purbasora and Sena were actually brothers. This was because Prince Sena was the result of a forbidden affair between Mandiminyak and his own sister in-law; the beautiful wife of Sempakwaja.

After the death of Mandiminyak, Prince Bratasena or Sena (r. 709–716), ascends as the new king; as the third monarch of Galuh. According to Carita Parahyangan and Wangsakerta manuscripts; King Sena of Galuh married to Princess Sannaha of Kalingga in Central Java, and they had Sanjaya as their son and heir. In an attempt to nurture a good relations with the neighboring Sunda Kingdom, King Sena established a friendship with King Tarusbawa of Sunda.

Purbasora, son of Batara Danghyang Guru Sempakwaja of the Galunggung Kingdom, also grandson of Wretikandayun, the founder of Galuh, deeply resent the reign of his cousin; King Sena. This was because he felt that instead of Sena that had a doubtful scandalous origin, he is more deserving to the throne of Galuh. With the aid of his father-in-law, King Indraprahasta, from a kingdom near present-day Cirebon, Purbasora rebelled, launched his coup and usurped Sena as the king of Galuh in 716. Defeated, Sena fled to Kalingga, the kingdom of his wife's grandmother, Queen Shima.

Since the crown prince of Sunda died before King Tarusbawa, Princess Tejakencana (the daughter of the crown prince) was hailed as the heiress of Sunda. She married Rakeyan Jamri, son of Bratasena (the third king of Galuh Kingdom and a son of Wretikandayun) and Princess Sannaha (from Kalingga), since her father, Tarusbawa, had a good friendship with King Bratasena. In 723, Jamri succeeded Tarusbawa as the second king of Sunda. As the lord of Sunda, he was known as Prabu Harisdarma and later when he ascended the throne of Galuh he was known as Sri Sanjaya.

=== Sanjaya and Balangantrang ===
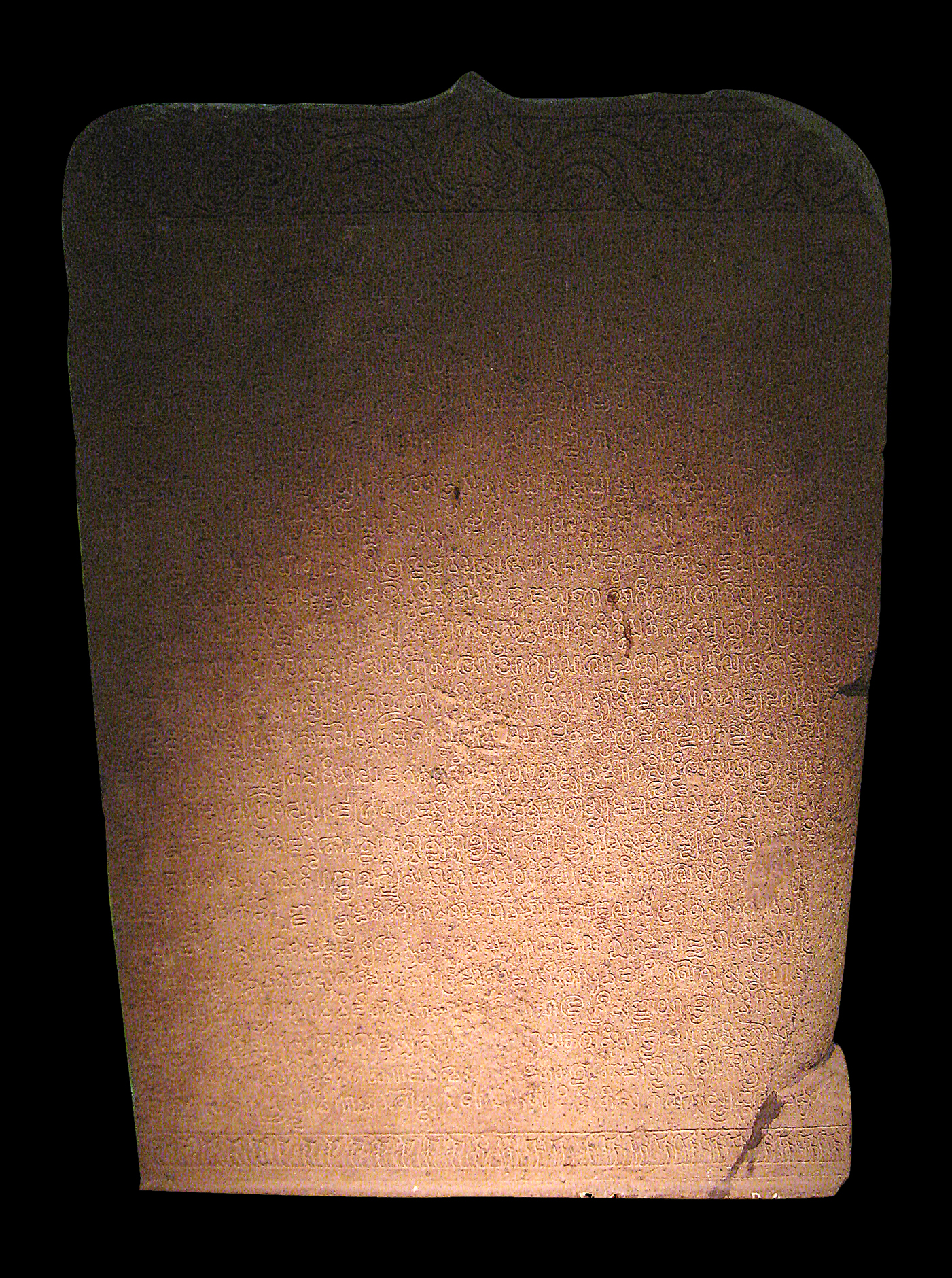
The valiant hero Sri Sanjaya was described in Sundanese manuscript Carita Parahyangan as the king of Sunda. However, he is also mentioned in Central Javanese Canggal inscription dated 732 as the king of Mataram.

Sanjaya, the son of Sena, determined to take revenge to Purbasora's rebellion. He requested aid from King Tarusbawa of Sunda, a friend of Sena. His wish was realised when he became the king of Sunda, reigning on behalf of his wife.

He prepared a special force, which he placed in the Gunung Sawal area with the help of Rabuyut Sawal, also a dear friend of Sena. This special force was led by Sanjaya, while the Sunda army was led by Patih Anggada. The raid was launched at nightfall. Almost all of Purbasora's family was wiped out, except for Bimaraksa, Purbasora's son-in-law; the minister of Galuh escaped with a handful of guards.

Bimaraksa, also known as Ki Balangantrang, was the Senapati (army general) of the kingdom. Balangantrang was also the grandson of Wretikandayun, as a child of his second son, Resi Guru Jantaka or Rahyang Kidul, and was also considered unfit to succeed Wretikandayun because he suffered from a hernia. Balangantrang hid in the village of Gègèr Sunten and raised anti-Sanjaya forces. He was supported by the kings of Kuningan and also by the remnants of the Indraprahasta army. Indraphrasta was annihilated by Sanjaya as revenge for helping Purbasora to oust Sena.

Sena asked Sanjaya to honour all of the Galuh royal family, except Purbasora. Sanjaya himself was not interested in ruling Galuh. He merely attacked it to fulfill his father's wish to take revenge on Purbasora's family. After defeating Purbasora, Sanjaya asked his granduncle, Sempakwaja, in Galunggung to order Demunawan, the younger brother of Purbasora, to reign in Galuh. But Sempakwaja declined, fearing this to be Sanjaya's trick to annihilate Demunawan.

Sanjaya himself could not find Balangantrang, so he accepted the Galuh throne. Realizing that he was unwelcomed at the Galuh court, and also that he was a Sunda king who must reside in Pakuan, he put Premana Dikusuma, grandson of Purbasora, in charge of Galuh. Premana Dikusuma at that time was a vassal king. At the age of 43 (born in 683 AD), he was already known as Rsi or an ascetic monk, because of his passion for learning and spiritual teaching since a young age, he is also known as Bagawat Sajalajaya.

Sanjaya also had legitimate right to Kalingga's throne (from his grandmother's side). Thus in 732 AD he chose to live in Kalingga (in the northern part of central Java) and later established the Mataram kingdom and Sanjaya dynasty. In 732 he gave his right to western Java to his son from Tejakencana, Prince Tamperan (Rakeyan Panaraban). Rakeyan was a half-brother of Rakai Panangkaran, Sanjaya's son from Sudiwara (daughter of Dewasinga, king of southern Kalingga).

=== Reunification of Sunda and Galuh ===
The Sundanese kingdoms of Sunda and Galuh coexisted under a strange and complex relationship; occasionally united under one ruler, and at other times as separated kingdoms under different rulers, albeit allied or related. The two kingdoms united as the Sunda Kingdom under the following kings:

- Sanjaya (723 – 732 AD) with the capital city in Kawali Galuh (present-day Ciamis city)
- Tamperan or Rakeyan Panaraban (in 732 - 739 AD) with the capital in Kawali Galuh
- Wuwus (819 – 891 AD) with the capital city in Pakuan (present-day Bogor City)
- Darmaraksa (891 – 895 AD) with the capital in Pakuan
- Prabu Guru Darmasiksa with the capital city in Sawunggalah (present-day Kuningan city)
- Rakeyan Jayadarma resided in Kawali
- Prabu Ragasuci (1297 – 1303 AD) resided in Saunggalah
- Prabu Citraganda (1303 – 1311 AD) resided in Pakuan
- Prabu Lingga Dewata (1311 – 1333 AD) perhaps resided in Kawali
- Prabu Ajiguna Wisesa (1333 – 1340 AD) resided in Kawali
- Prabu Ragamulya Luhur Prabawa (1340 – 1350 AD) resided in Kawali
- Prabu Maharaja Lingga Buana (1350 – 1357 AD) resided in Kawali
- Prabu Mangkubumi Suradipati/Prabu Bunisora (1357 – 1371 AD) resided in Kawali
- Prabu Raja Wastu/Niskala Wastu Kancana (1371 – 1475 AD) resided in Kawali
- Prabu Susuk Tunggal (1382 – 1482 AD) resided in Kawali (as Galuh Kingdom)
- Prabu Dewa Niskala (1375 – 1482 AD) resided in Pakuan (as Sunda Kingdom)
- Sri Baduga Maharaja (1482 – 1521 AD) resided in Pakuan
- Surawisesa (1521 – 1535 AD) resided in Pakuan
- Ratu Dewata (1535 – 1543 AD) resided in Pakuan
- Ratu Sakti (1543 – 1551 AD) resided in Pakuan
- Ratu Nilakendra (1551 – 1567 AD) resided in Pakuan
- Raga Mulya (1567 – 1579 AD) resided in Pakuan

=== Rakryan Juru Pangambat ===
According to Kebon Kopi II inscription, dated from 854 Saka (932 CE), discovered in Kebon Kopi village, Bogor, a noble which also a skilled hunter named Juru Pangambat, declared that the authority (order) is returned to the king of Sunda. This inscription was written in Kawi alphabet, however curiously the language being used is Old Malay. Archaeologist F. D. K. Bosch, that had studied the inscription, proposed that the use of Old Malay suggests Srivijayan influence on Western Java. French historian, Claude Guillot from École française d'Extrême-Orient proposed that this was a declaration of independence (possibly from Srivijaya) of the Kingdom of Sunda.

=== Jayabupati ===
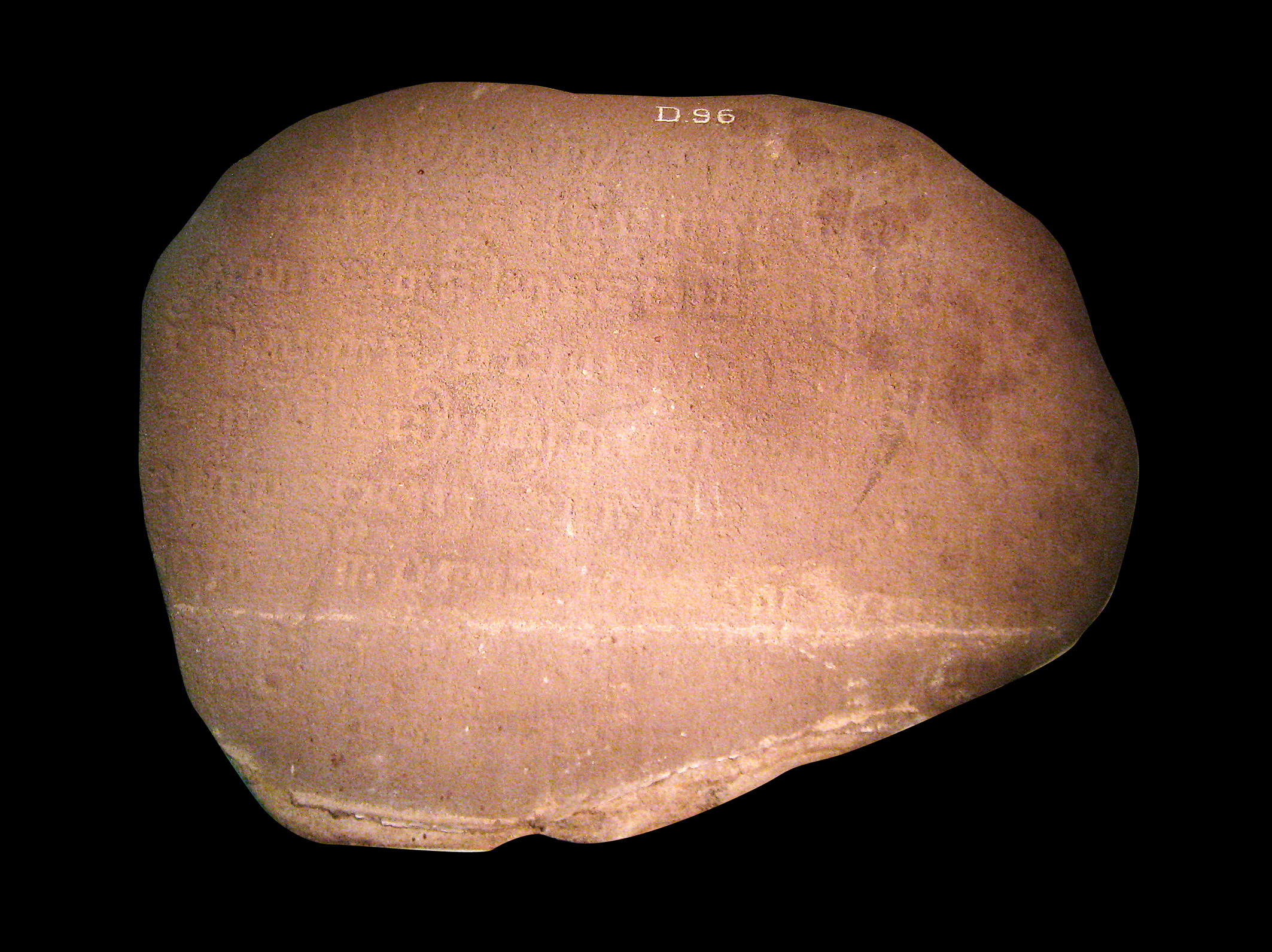
Sanghyang Tapak inscription

According to Sanghyang Tapak inscription, dated from 952 saka (1030 CE) found in Cicatih River bank in Cibadak, Sukabumi, Maharaja Sri Jayabupati established a sacred sanctuary of Sanghyang Tapak. Strangely the style of the inscriptions reveal an East Javanese style of script. Not only letters, language, and style, but the noble name of the king is similar to royal names in Dharmawangsa's court of East Javanese Mataram kingdom. This has led to suggestions that Sunda Kingdom at this time probably was under the influence of East Java, possibly a vassal. Or probably Jayabupati consciously subscribed to Javanese culture among Sundanese population.

Sri Jayabupati in Carita Parahyangan is mentioned as Prabu Detya Maharaja. According to Pustaka Nusantara, Parwa III sarga 1, Sri Jayabupati reigned for 12 years (952-964) Saka (1030-1042). The 11th century Horren inscription of Southern Kediri, reported that çatru Sunda (enemy from Sunda) had invaded and menacing villages in East Java. It was not clear however, which Sundanese faction has committed such brigandage as far east to Kediri, nor whether Sri Jayabupati was responsible for this.

After Sri Jayabupati, there is no stone inscription discovered mentioning the next ruler. There is no tangible evidence discovered from the period between 11th to 14th century. Most of our current knowledge about this period came from Carita Parahyangan and Wangsakerta manuscripts.

The Chinese Song dynasty source, Chu-fan-chi, written circa 1200, Chou Ju-kua identified the two most powerful and richest kingdoms in the Indonesian archipelago as Srivijaya and Java (Kediri). According to this source, in the early 13th century, Srivijaya still ruled Sumatra, the Malay peninsula, and western Java (Sunda). The source describes the port of Sunda as strategic and thriving, pepper from Sunda being among the best in quality. The people worked in agriculture and their houses were built on wooden poles (rumah panggung). However, robbers and thieves plagued the country. It was uncertain which port of Sunda was referred to by Chou Ju-kua, it probably referred to the port of Banten, and not Kalapa. It seems that by the early 13th century, the maritime trade was still dominated by Srivijayan mandala based in Sumatra. The port of Sunda still pretty much served as a trading post or colony of Srivijaya. Nevertheless, the Sunda Kingdom in the inland west Java still enjoyed internal autonomy.

=== Rakeyan Jayadarma ===
According to Pustaka Rajyarajya i Bhumi Nusantara parwa II sarga 3, Rakeyan Jayadarma was the son-in-law of Mahisa Campaka of Singhasari. During the reign of Prabu Guru Dharmasiksa (1175–1297) Prince Jayadharma married Dyah Singamurti, also known as Dyah Lembu Tal. Sangrama Wijaya (Raden Wijaya), the first King of Majapahit, was the son of the Sunda king, Rakeyan Jayadharma. Except for Gajah Mada, who insisted on incorporating the Sunda Kingdom within the Majapahit realm, this is the likely reason why Majapahit kings were reluctant to attack the Sunda Kingdom. There was a sacred alliance between the Sunda Kingdom and the Majapahit Kingdom.

== Golden age ==
The name "Sunda" appeared again in Javanese source. This time the Pararaton reported that in 1336, during the reign of Majapahit Queen Tribhuwana Wijayatunggadewi, at the inauguration of his newly appointed position as Patih Amangkubhumi (Prime Minister), Gajah Mada declared Palapa oath, which stated his foreign policy to unify the archipelago under Majapahit domination. Gajah Mada said "Lamun huwus kalah nusantara isun amukti palapa, lamun kalah ring Gurun, ring Seran, Tañjung Pura, ring Haru, ring Pahang, Dompo, ring Bali, Sunda, Palembang, Tumasik, samana isun amukti palapa". Sunda was mentioned as one of kingdoms targeted by Mada's overseas campaign. It seems by the early 14th century, Kingdom of Sunda has grown quite prosperous and took part in international maritime trade. Quite significantly, so the kingdom has attracted the interest of Majapahit Prime Minister.

=== Maharaja Lingga Buana ===
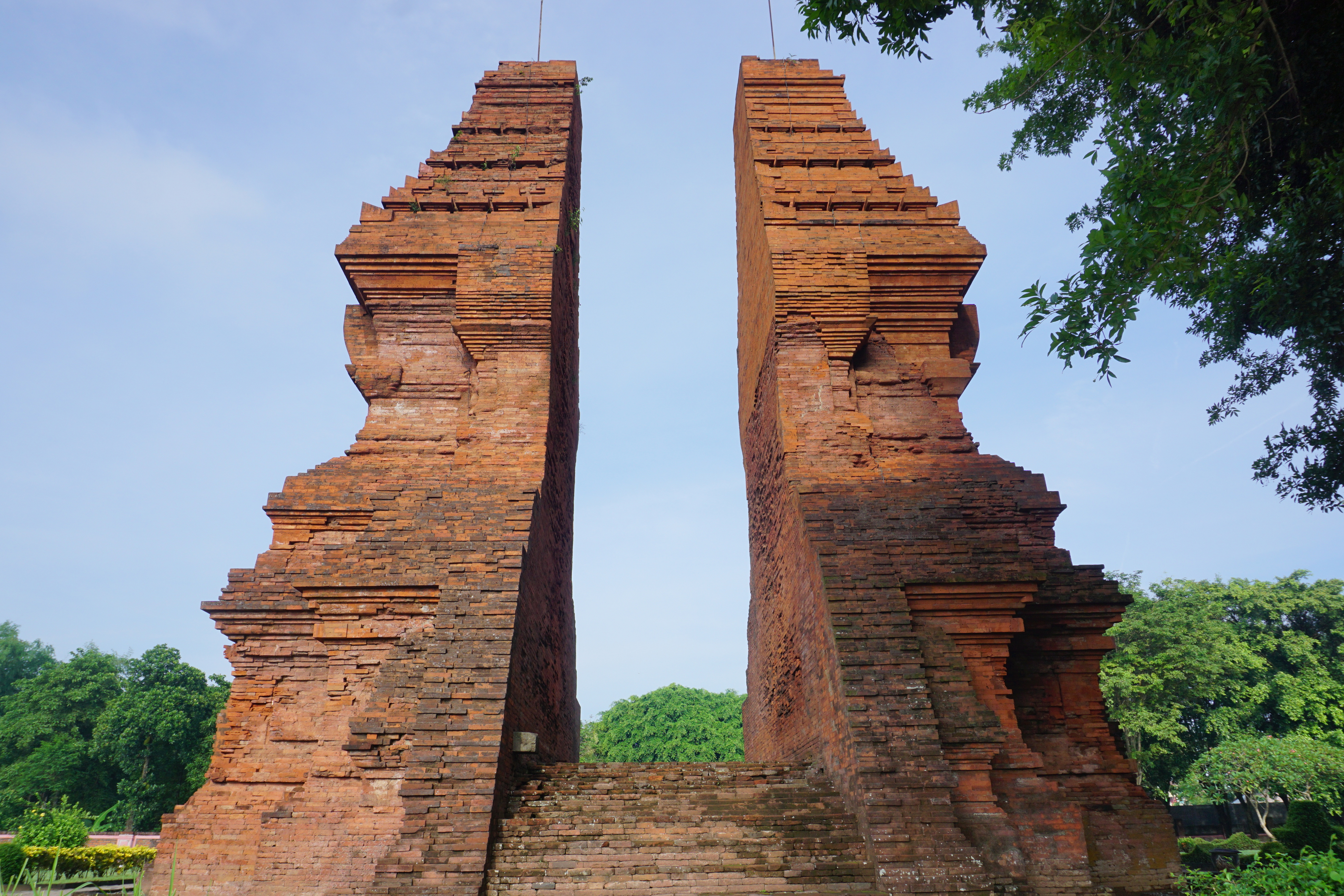
Wringin Lawang split gate in Trowulan, According to Nagarakretagama, Bubat square is located on northern parts of Trowulan, Majapahit capital city, probably somewhere near this gate or Brahu temple. Bubat square was the location of Pasunda Bubat incident where the Sundanese royal party perished.

The Carita Parahyangan and Pararaton simply named him as Prěbu Maharaja. While the Wangsakerta manuscript give a detailed name of Prabu Maharaja Lingga Buana. He resided in Kawali Galuh. He died in the Battle of Bubat, Majapahit, in 1357, fell victim to a stratagem crafted by the Majapahit prime minister, Gajah Mada. The tragedy's prelude came with the intention of Hayam Wuruk, the king of Majapahit, to marry Princess Dyah Pitaloka (also known as Citraresmi), a daughter of Prabu Maharaja Lingga Buana. Delighted by the prospect to foster an alliance with the most powerful kingdom in the region, the Sunda king and his royal family came to Majapahit, sailing through the Java Sea, to accompany and marry his daughter to Hayam Wuruk. The Sunda party erected the encampment on Bubat square in the northern part of Trowulan, Majapahit capital, and awaited the proper wedding ceremony. Gajah Mada however, saw this event as an opportunity to demand Sunda's submission to Majapahit overlordship, and insisted that instead of becoming the queen of Majapahit, the princess was to be presented as a concubine for the Majapahit king, as a token of her kingdom's submission. The Sunda king was angered and humiliated by Gajah Mada's demand.

As a result, there was a skirmish between the Sunda royal family and the Majapahit army. The Majapahit army decimated the Sunda royal family; almost the entire Sundanese royal party, including the princess, perished in this tragedy. Tradition mentioned that Princess Dyah Pitaloka committed suicide to defend the honour and pride of her country. After his death, Prabu Maharaja Lingga Buana was revered by the Sundanese as Prabu Wangi (lit. king with pleasant fragrance) because of his heroic defence of his honour against Majapahit, and his descendants, the later kings of Sunda, were called Siliwangi (lit. successor of Wangi). The story of the Battle of Bubat is the main theme of the book Kidung Sunda.

=== Niskala Wastu Kancana ===
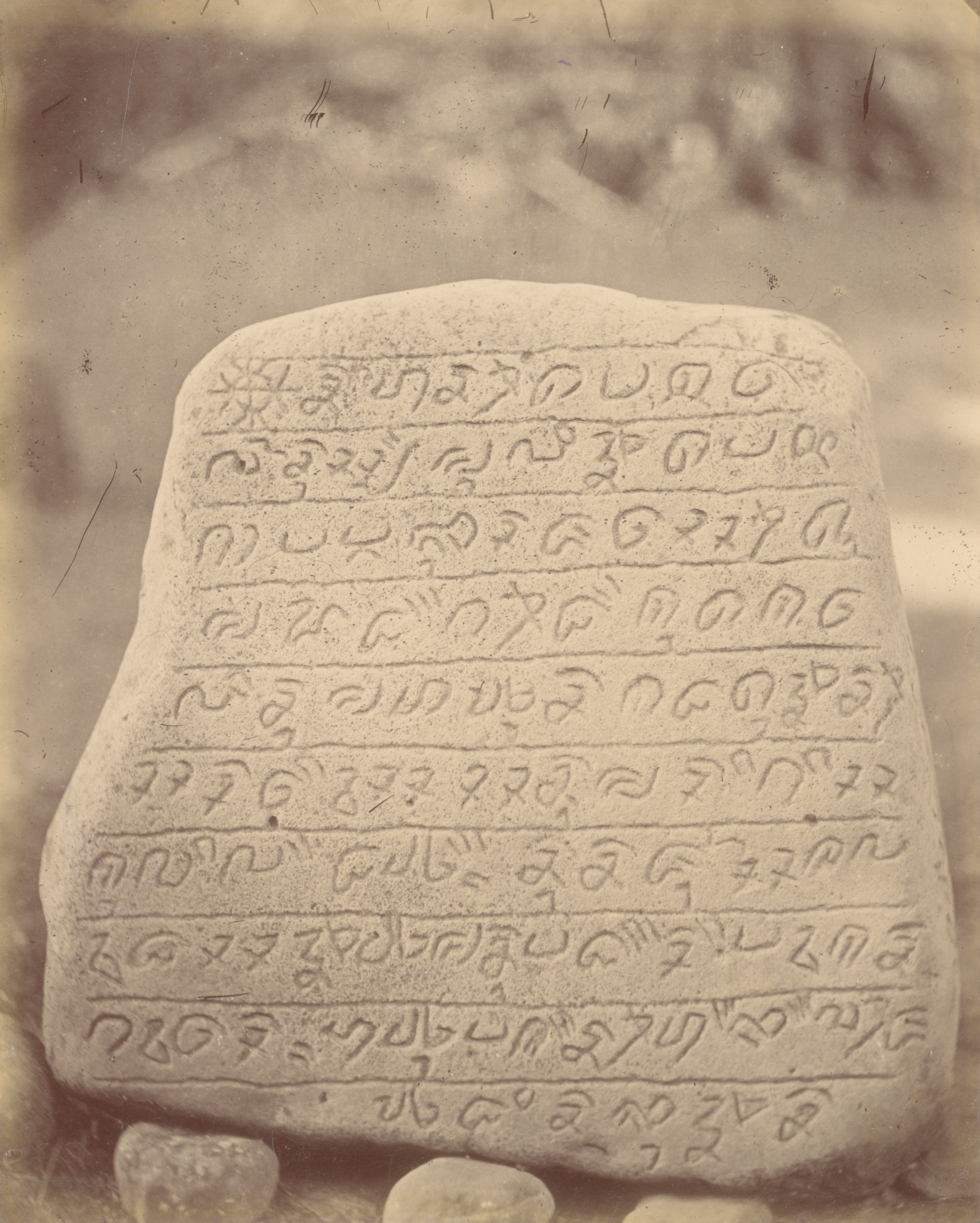
One of Kawali inscriptions

King Niskala Wastu Kancana was the youngest son of Prabu Maharaja and the brother of Princess Pitaloka Citraresmi, both perished in Majapahit. In 1371, Prince Wastu ascended to throne, stylized as Prabu Raja Wastu Kancana. According to Kawali inscription, approximately dated from second half of the 14th century, mentioned that King Prabu Raja Wastu constructed the defensive structures; walls and moats surrounding Kawali city, and renovated Surawisesa palace. The construction of moats and other defensive measures, was probably as a response to a perceived foreign threat. Since the relations between Sunda and its eastern neighbour, the powerful Majapahit empire, was badly deteriorated after the Bubat incident. Niskala Wastu resided in Kawali palace of Galuh, and ruled for 104 years (1371–1475). His reign is remembered as a long era of peace and prosperity.

The copperplate inscription of Kebantenan I (Jayagiri) reads that Raja Rahyang Niskala Wastu Kancana sent an order through Hyang Ningrat Kancana to the Susuhunan of Pakuan Pajajaran to take care of dayohan in Jayagiri and Sunda Sembawa, banning the collection of taxes from the residents because they were knowledgeable about the (Hindu) religion and worshiped the gods.

According to Batutulis inscription, Rahyang Niskala Wastu Kancana was buried in Nusalarang, while his successor Rahyang Dewa Niskala was buried in Gunatiga. This information is supported by Carita Parahyangan manuscript that mentioned Prebu Niskala Wastu Kancana surup di Nusalarang ring giri Wanakusumah, while his successor was nu surup di Gunung Tilu'. In Carita Parahyangan, Dewa Niskala or Ningrat Kancana is not mentioned completely, but only referred as "Tohaan di Galuh" (Lord of Galuh). At this point, the Sunda Kingdom capital was still located in Galuh, more precisely in Kawali city.

=== Ningrat Kancana ===
Niskala Wastu Kancana's son, named as Tohaan di Galuh (Lord of Galuh) in Carita Parahyangan, succeeded him as the king. He was mentioned in Kebantenan I (Jayagiri) inscription as Hyang Ningrat Kancana and in Batutulis inscription as Rahyang Dewa Niskala.

The new king however, reigned for only seven years and subsequently demoted. Carita Parahyangan tell that "... kena salah twa(h) bogo(h) ka estri larangan ti kaluaran ..," which translate as "because (his) wrongdoing, fell in love with a forbidden outsider woman." The term "outsider woman" is interesting and has led to various proposition; could it be the new king fell in love with a foreigner, outsider, non-Sundanese, or non-Hindu (Muslim) woman.

According to Batutulis inscription, Rahyang Dewa Niskala was buried in Gunatiga. This information is supported by Carita Parahyangan manuscript that mentioned that Tohaan di Galuh was nu surup di Gunung Tilu' died or buried in Gunung Tilu. Gunatiga and Gunung Tilu means "Three mountains" which corresponds to Gunung Tilu mountain range located east of the town of Kuningan. Today, Gunung Tilu marked as the boundary between West Java and Central Java provinces, located between Kuningan Regency and Brebes Regency.

=== Sri Baduga Maharaja ===
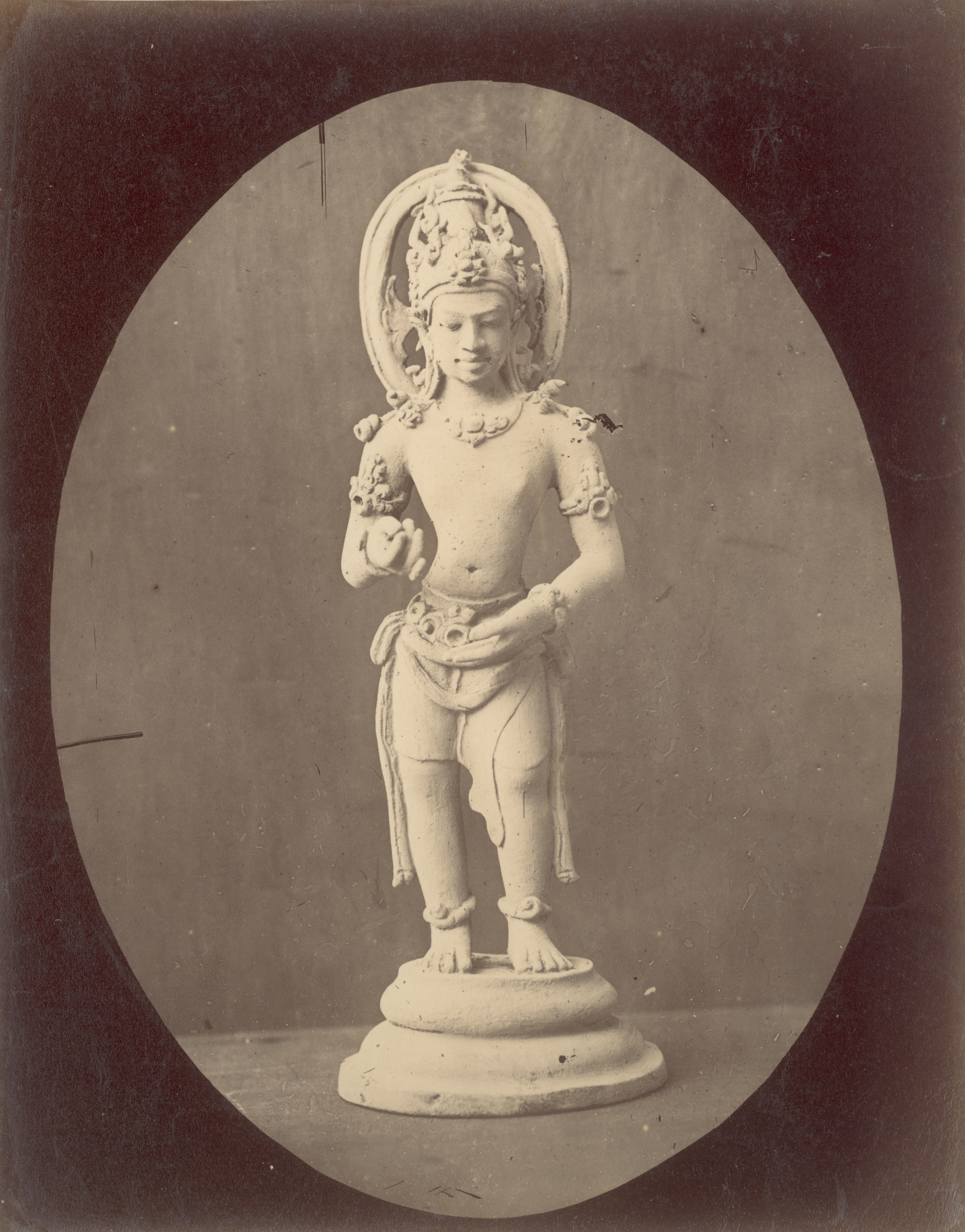
Statue of a Hindu god from Talaga near Kuningan, West Java, dated from Sunda Kingdom.

Sang Ratu Jayadewata or also known as Sri Baduga Maharaja, is a grandchild of Prabu Wastu Kancana or Prabu Niskala Wastu. Jayadewata is often linked with a popular character Prabu Siliwangi in the Sundanese oral tradition of Pantun.

King Jayadewata moved the government seat from Kawali back to Pakuan in 1482. It is not clear however, the reason behind the transfer of capital westward from Kawali to Pakuan Pajajaran. It might be a geopolitical move to secure the capital away from the eastern threat from Islamic state of Demak in Central Java. As by 1482, according to Purwaka Caruban Nagari, a Cirebon chronicle, Cirebon declared its independence from Sunda and no longer sent tribute to the Sunda court.

Based on Kebantenan copperplate inscription, he established a sacred estate (tanah devasasana) at Mount Samya (Rancamaya) and ordered that anyone entering was forbidden to disturb this area and forbade the imposition of taxes and other levies because this devasana contained royal facilities for worship. He also announced that holy construction in Sunda Sembawa, which should be cared for and be undisturbed because the area stipulated is the residential area of the wiku (priests).

According to Batutulis inscription, Sri Baduga Maharaja built defensive moats surrounding Pakuan Pajajaran; he built "gugunungan" (sacred mounds), established huts and sacred Samya forest, reserves for wood destined for offerings, and the Talaga Rena Mahawijaya Lake. Certainly, there was a good road to Sunda Kalapa (present-day Jakarta Metropolitan city) too, the most important harbour of the Sunda kingdom. At the time of Tome Pirés visit to Pakuan, Sri Baduga Maharaja reigned over the Sunda kingdom (1482 to 1521).

The year of his coronation in 1482 has been mentioned as the birth date of the present-day city of Bogor. However, there was an important settlement at the site already, and Pakuan had been the capital of the Sunda kingdom under previous kings. The reign of Ratu Jayadewata was hailed as the "golden age" of the Sundanese people. The kingdom consolidated its rule and exercised power throughout western part of Java. It also marked the era of great prosperity resulting from efficient agriculture management and the thriving pepper trade in the region. This era of great wealth also marked the beginning of Sunda kingdom's decline.

== Decline ==
During the reign of Sang Ratu Jayadewata, there was already a group of Sunda inhabitant that has converted to a new faith (Islam), as testified by Portuguese account. Tomé Pires in 1513 reported, there is a significant numbers of Muslims resides in the port of Cimanuk, the easternmost port of Sunda Kingdom, which is the estuarine of Cimanuk River in present-day town of Indramayu. According to Portuguese report, the port of Cirebon which is located just east from Cimanuk, is already a Muslim port by this time, ruled by Javanese.

Probably these new converts were the people referred to in Carita Parahyangan as "those who felt no peace because have violated (strayed from) Sanghyang Siksa". Nevertheless, during this time, Islamic influence has not yet penetrated inland into the capital. As mentioned in Carita Parahyangan ... mana mo kadatangan ku musuh ganal, musu(h) alit ..., which means the capital is "safe from rough/coarse enemy, (as well as) soft/subtle enemy". The term "coarse enemy" refer to actual invading foreign army, while "subtle enemy" refer to the propagation of a new faith or new religion that might upset the established spiritual order of the kingdom.

The Kingdom of Sunda anxiously watched the growing influence of the expansive Islamic Sultanate of Demak that finally succeeded to destroy Daha, the remnant of Hindu Majapahit court, in 1517. As a result of this event, only Blambangan in the eastern edge of Java, and Sunda in the western part remained Hindu kingdoms in Java. Meanwhile, in the land of Sunda, Muslim influences started to penetrate the kingdom.

=== Rise of Muslim States, Cirebon and Banten ===
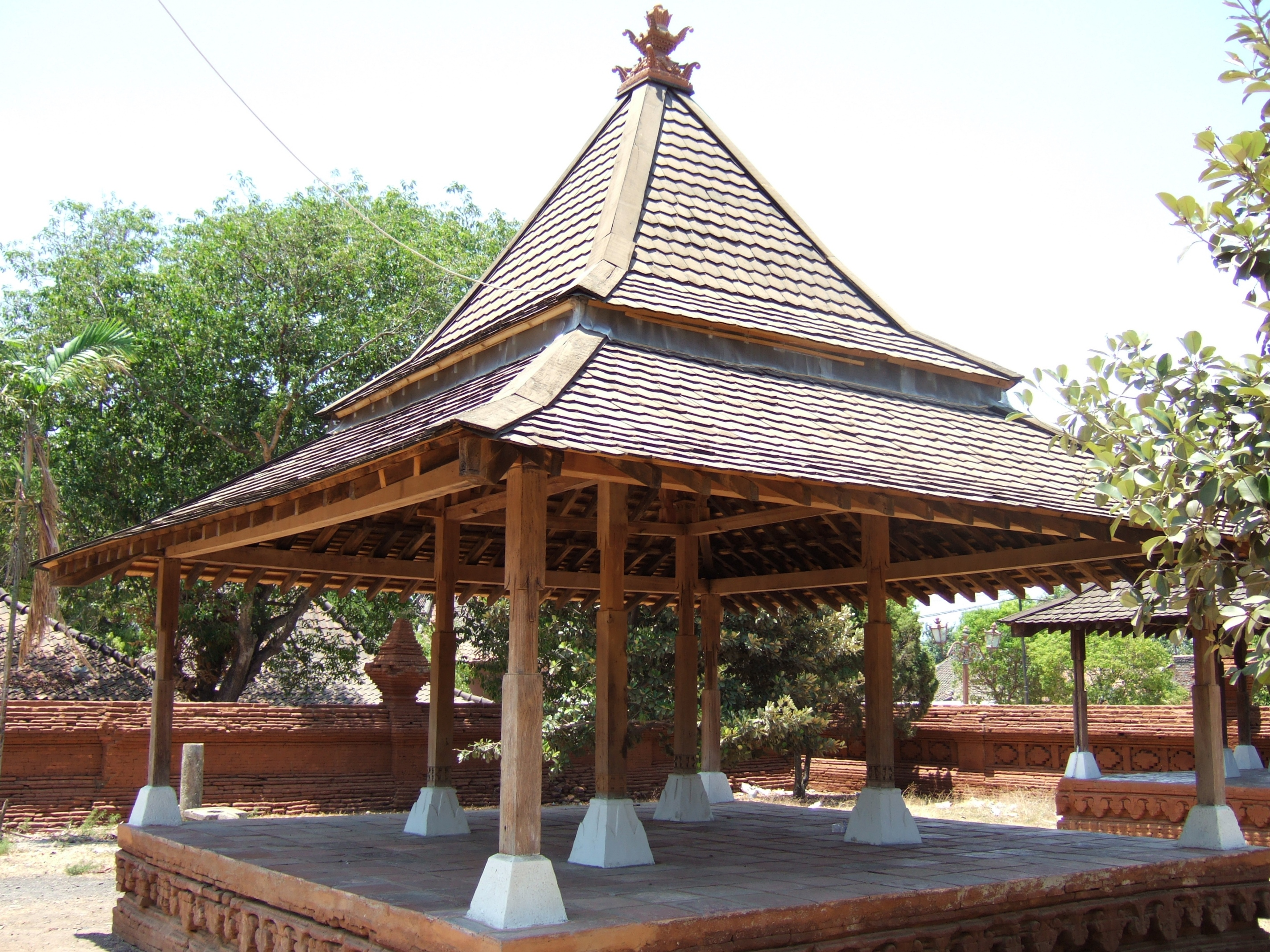
Keraton Kasepuhan of Cirebon. By 1482, the Sunda kingdom lost its important eastern port of Cirebon.

Bujangga Manik manuscript, written circa the second half of the 15th century (1450–1500) reported that the eastern boundary of Sunda Kingdom realm with its Javanese neighbour was the Cipamali river in present-day Brebes Regency. However, the Portuguese Suma Oriental in 1513 reported that the eastern border of Sunda Kingdom is located in the port of Chemano (Cimanuk), the estuarine of Manuk River, which today corresponds to the town of Indramayu. Portuguese source also reported the presence of Muslim inhabitant and traders in Cimanuk. This means between 1450 and 1513 the Sunda kingdom has lost control on the area surrounding Cirebon; between Brebes and Indramayu. This signify the coastal Muslim Javanese push westward into once a traditional Sundanese area, as Demak Sultanate was responsible as the patron that led to the rise of Cirebon Sultanate.

The detail of Sunda Kingdom and its relations with the rise of Cirebon Sultanate, mostly were taken from the account of Purwaka Caruban Nagari, a manuscript of Cirebon chronicle explaining the advent of this Sultanate, which also claimed Cirebon as the rightful successor of Sunda Kingdom.

According to Purwaka Caruban Nagari, Sunda King Siliwangi married Nyai Subang Larang, daughter of Ki Gedeng Tapa, port master of Muara Jati, which corresponds with the port of Cirebon. They had three children; Prince Walangsungsang born in 1423, Princess Rara Santang born in 1426, and Prince Kian Santang (Raden Sangara) born in 1428. Although Prince Walangsungsang was the first-born son of Sunda King, the prince did not earn the right as a crown prince of Sunda Kingdom. This was because his mother, Nyai Subang Larang was not the prameswari (queen consort). Another reason was probably because of his conversion to Islam, probably influenced by his mother, Subang Larang whom was a Muslim woman. In 16th century West Java, the state's religion was Hinduism, Sunda Wiwitan (Sundanese ancestral religion) and Buddhism. It was his half brother, King Siliwangi's son from his third wife Nyai Cantring Manikmayang, who was chosen as crown prince.

Walangsungsang, assisted by Ki Gedheng Danusela, established a new settlement called Dukuh Alang-alang on 8 April 1445. After Ki Gedeng Alang-Alang's death in 1447, Walangsungsang appointed as the ruler of the town and established a court and assumed a new title as Prince Cakrabuana. King Siliwangi sent his envoy Tumenggung Jagabaya and Raja Sengara (Cakrabuana's younger brother), to bestow Prince Carkrabuana with the title Tumenggung Sri Mangana. Cirebon grew into a thriving port, yet Cakrabuana still loyal to his father and sent tribute to the main court of Sunda. At that time Cirebon was still the vassal of Sunda Kingdom.

After his Resignation in 1479 CE, Cakrabuana was succeeded by his nephew, Sharif Hidayatullah (1448-1568), the son of Nyai Rara Santang (Syarifah Mudaim) and Sharif Abdullah of Egypt. He married his cousin, Nyi Mas Pakungwati daughter of Cakrabuana. He is popularly known with his posthumously name, Sunan Gunung Jati. In 1482, the Sunda kingdom lost one of its important ports, Cirebon. On 2 April 1482, Sunan Gunungjati, the ruler of Cirebon (and also the grandson of King Siliwangi), stated that Cirebon will no longer send tribute to Pajajaran, which marked the proclamation of the Sultanate of Cirebon as independence from Sunda Pajajaran.

The character described in Purwaka Caruban Nagari, as King Siliwangi, both timeline and storyline, matched the historic character of Dewa Niskala or Ningrat Kancana, referred as "Tohaan di Galuh" (Lord of Galuh) in Carita Parahyangan. Tohaan di Galuh was the son and heir of Niskala Wastu Kancana. Ningrat Kancana however, reigned for only seven years and subsequently demoted. Carita Parahyangan tell that "... kena salah twa(h) bogo(h) ka estri larangan ti kaluaran ..," which translate as "because (his) wrongdoing, fell in love with a forbidden outsider woman." The term "outsider woman" is interesting and has led to various proposition; could it be the new king fell in love with a foreigner, outsider, non-Sundanese, or even non-Hindu (Muslim) woman. It is possible that the outsider forbidden woman mentioned here was Nyai Subang Larang, a Muslim woman daughter of port master of Muara Jati (Cirebon).

The pressure from coastal Javan Islamic states drove the king of Sunda, Sri Baduga Maharaja, to seek assistance from the Portuguese at Malacca. In 1512 and again in 1521, he sent his son, the crown prince Prabu Surawisesa also known as Ratu Sang Hyang (the Portuguese record it as Samian) to Malacca to request the Portuguese to sign an alliance treaty, to trade in pepper and to build a fort at his main port of Sunda Kalapa.

Sunan Gunung Jati's son later also established the Sultanate of Banten, which later become a menace for Hindu Sunda kingdom.

=== Prabu Surawisesa Jayaperkasa ===
After Sri Baduga Maharaja's death in 1521, the succeeding kings, Prabu Surawisesa Jayaperkosa, also known as Ratu Sang Hyang whom the Portuguese called Ratu Samian, faced the threat of the Sultanate of Cirebon and Demak expanding nearer his kingdom. Under this threat, Prabu Surawisesa Jayaperkasa, who reigned from 1521 to 1535, concluded the treaty with Portuguese from Malacca to establish a warehouse and fortress at Sunda Kelapa in return for protection against the menace of these Islamic Sultanates.

=== Sunda–Portuguese Treaty 1522 ===
By 1522, the Portuguese were ready to form a coalition with the King of Sunda to get access to his lucrative pepper trade. The commander of the fortress of Malacca at that time was Jorge de Albuquerque. He sent a ship, the São Sebastião, under Captain Henrique Leme, to Sunda Kalapa with valuable gifts for the king of Sunda. Two written sources describe the concluding of the treaty in detail, the original Portuguese document of 1522 with the text of the treaty and the signatories of the witnesses, and a report on that event by João de Barros in his book Da Ásia, printed after 1777/78.

According to these sources, the king welcomed them warmly upon their arrival. The crown prince had succeeded his father and was now King Prabu Surawisesa, although Barros called him King Samião. This Sunda ruler agreed to an arrangement of friendship with the King of Portugal and granted a fortress at the mouth of the Ciliwung River where the Portuguese could load as many ships as they wished with pepper. In addition, he pledged, dating from the start of construction on the fortress, each year he would donate one thousand sacks of pepper to the Portuguese king. The contract document was drafted into two copies and signed. On the said day in 1522, Henrique Leme of Portuguese and his entourage together with deputies of the King of Sunda, erected a commemoration stone, called Padrão, at the mouth of the Ciliwung River.

=== The fall of Sunda Kelapa ===
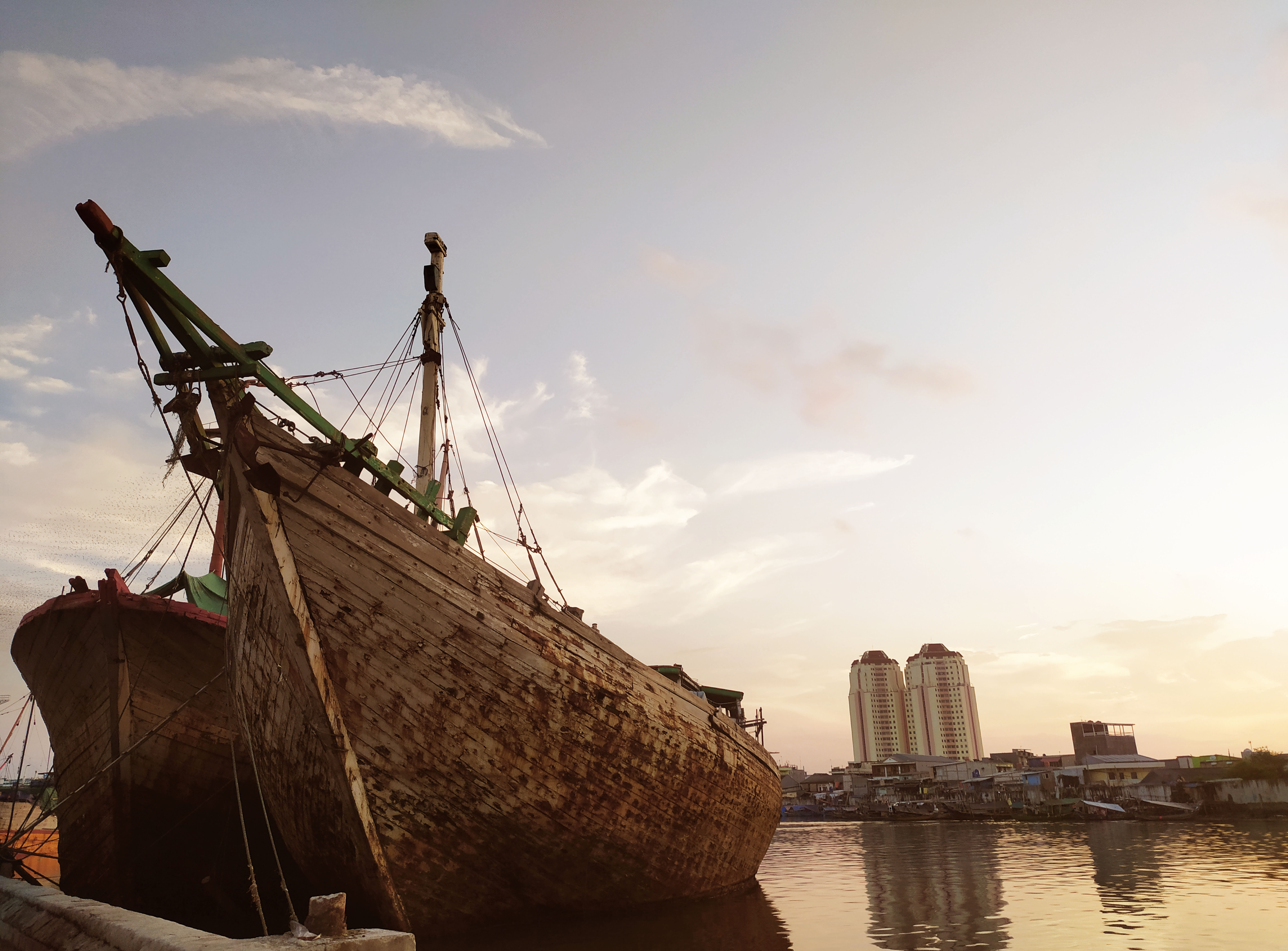
The port of Sunda Kelapa (lit. "coconut of Sunda"), the cradle of Jakarta. For centuries it was the royal port of Sunda Kingdom serving the capital Dayeuh Pakuan Pajajaran 60 kilometres inland to the south, until it fell to Demak and Cirebon forces in 1527.

This trade and defence treaty with the Portuguese, the Luso Sundanese Treaty, was fallen apart tremendously due to Portuguese failure to deliver their promise to construct the fortress in Kalapa. The delay was caused by troubles in Portuguese Goa in India. To make things worse, in 1527 Fatahillah, a military general sent from Demak, managed to capture the Sunda Kalapa harbour just before the Portuguese returned.

The army of Paletehan or Fatahillah, also called Fadillah Khan (1487–1570), comprising around 1452 troops from the Cirebon-Demak alliance, conquered Sunda Kalapa. The Sunda military commander and his troops stationed in the port were all fallen. The harbour chief and his family, the royal minister, and all of the people working in the harbour were slaughtered. Most of the city was helplessly destroyed and razed, as the Sundanese reinforcements sent from Pakuan realised that their forces were too weak and retreated. Sunda Kingdom has lost its most important port, thus subsequently Sunda Kalapa Harbour was renamed Jayakarta or Jakarta by its Muslim conqueror.

Thirty Portuguese sailors, shipwrecked by storms, swam to the beach at Kalapa only to be killed by Fadillah Khan's men. The Portuguese recognised the political leadership had changed when they were not allowed to set foot on the land. As they were too weak for a battle, they set sail back to Malacca. The next year, a second attempt failed because of striking sailors angry at not having been paid.

=== Ongoing battles ===
The failure to rely on Portuguese assistance has led Sunda Kingdom to fend for their own survival by themselves. Carita Parahyangan mentioned that during his 14 years of reign (1521–1535), King Sang Hyang (Surawisesa) has fought in 15 battles. Unbeatable, all in which he managed to repel the series of invading Muslim forces from Cirebon and Demak. He fought in Kalapa, Tanjung, Ancol Kiji, Wahanten Girang, Simpang, Gunung Batu, Saung Agung, Rumbut, Gunung, Gunung Banjar, Padang, Panggoakan, Muntur, Hanum, Pagerwesi, and Medangkahyangan.

The war between Cirebon-Demak forces and the Sunda kingdom lasted for almost five years. The king lost around 1000 of his men. During this war, after Sunda Kalapa, Sunda Kingdom also lost another important port, the port of Banten to their Cirebon-Demak Muslim nemesis. Sunan Gunungjati (Syarif Hidayatullah) of Cirebon crowned his son, Hasanudin, as the king of Banten under the auspices of the Sultan of Demak who, in turn, offered Hasanudin his sister's hand in marriage. Thus, a new dynasty was born at the same time as a new kingdom was created. Banten was established as the capital of this new sultanate, held as a province under Sultanate of Cirebon. Finally, in 1531, a peace treaty was concluded between King Surawisesa of Sunda and Syarif Hidayatullah of Cirebon.

In an apparent sorrow after the tremendous defeat and the loss of his two most important ports, Prabu Surawisesa established the Batutulis inscription in 1533 AD to commemorate his late father. This action was probably an attempt to spiritually appeal for ancestral guidance, assistance and protection against the powerful Muslim enemy that now loomed by the gates. Because of ongoing battles, he often could not stay in his palace in Pakuan Pajajaran.

=== Ratu Dewata ===
Prabu Ratu Dewata also known as Sang Ratu Jaya Dewata, was the successor of Prabu Surawisesa, however he was not his son. The reign of Prabu Ratu Dewata between 1535 and 1543 was known as a chaotic and difficult one full of hardship, as Islamic forces from Cirebon and Banten tried for multiple times to capture the Dayeuh Pakuan capital.

=== The period of chaos and terror ===
During Ratu Dewata reign, the Carita Parahyangan reported several calamities befell the kingdom; there was a sudden attack, a lot of enemies razed the city, thus a mass combat erupted in the grand yard (alun-alun). In this battle, the noble princes; Tohaan Serendet and Tohaan Ratu Sanghyang were killed. The chaos has widespread across the kingdom, the attack also occurred in Ciranjang and Sumedang. Another horrifying terror was the assassins of unknown origin slaughtering the rishis, hermits and Hindu priests that resides in the mandalas (hermitage sanctuaries). It was reported that the Hindu priests and hermits of mandala Jayagiri, a sacred sanctuary established by the late King Jayadewata, were captured and drowned into the sea. It is highly possible that the attack was launched by Muslim states of Banten or Cirebon. This was a devastating attack straight to the spiritual core of the Sundanese Hindu community.

Unable to control the kingdom, instead of fulfilling his duty by maintaining the law and order, Prabu Ratu Dewata retreated himself to become a Raja Pandita (priestly king), submitted himself deeply into religious rituals as an apparently desperate appeal for gods' salvation. By this time, Sunda Kingdom were already isolated and confined to inland, as one by one Sunda's ports were captured by Islamic forces of Banten and Cirebon.

=== Last kings and the fall of Sunda kingdom ===
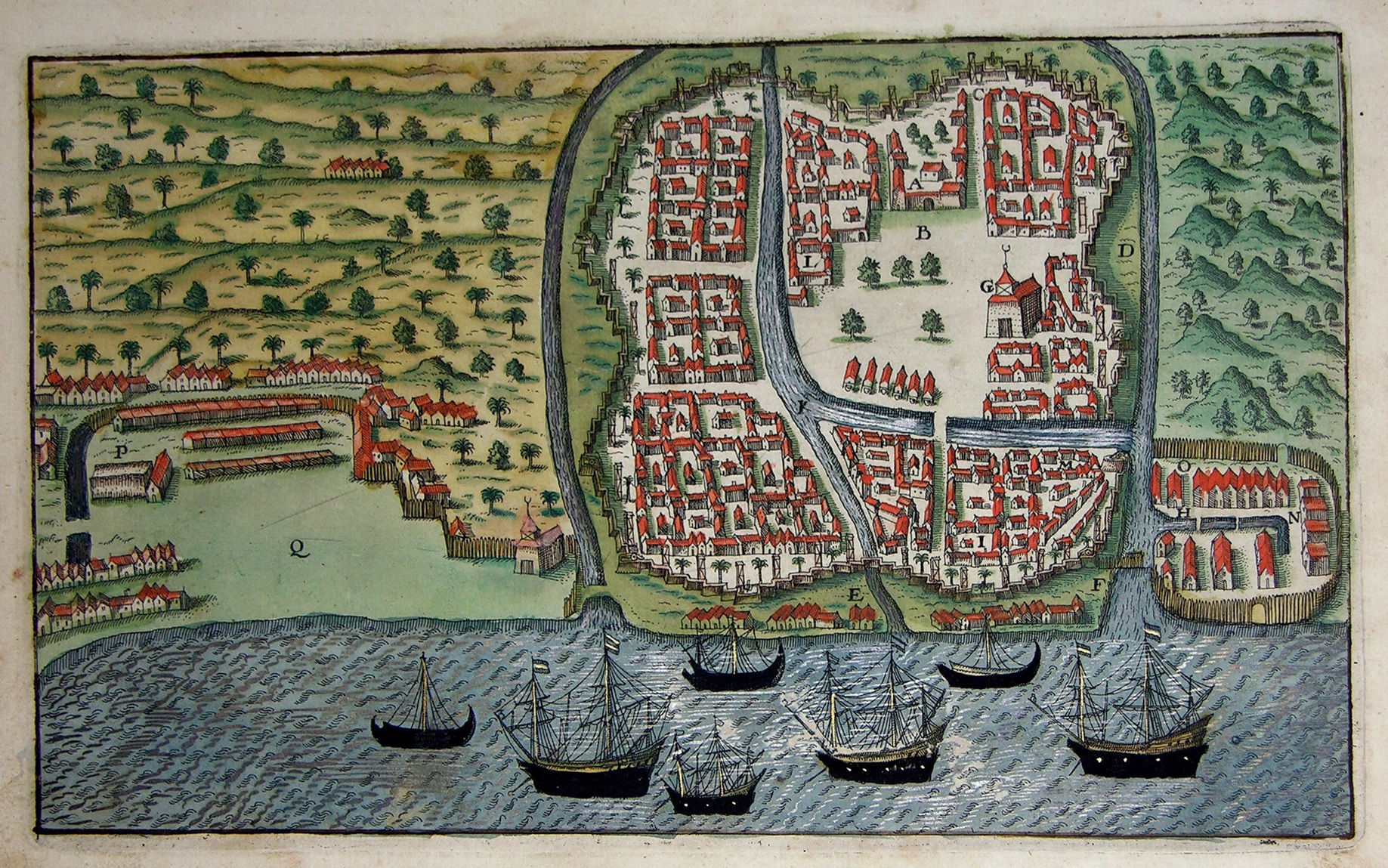
The Port of Banten in the 16th century. The Islamic Sultanate of Banten was responsible for the demise of Hindu Sunda Kingdom, and supplant it as the dominant polity in western parts of Java on the following centuries.

Series of last Sunda kings were notoriously known as incompetent rulers. The successor of Ratu Dewata, King Ratu Sakti reigned from 1543 to 1551, was known as a ruthless king, whom indulge himself with women and sensual pleasure.

The next successor that ruled from 1551 to 1567, King Nilakendra, also known as Tohaan di Majaya, is also an incompetent ruler. Instead of fulfill his duty as a king, he renovate and beautify the palace. Squander kingdom's fortune by indulging himself in luxury, binge drinking and parties.

Because of ongoing battles, ironically Tohaan di Majaya could not stay in his newly renovated palace. The last kings of Sunda could no longer reside in Pakuan Pajajaran, since in 1550s Hasanuddin, sultan of Banten has launched a successful attack to Dayeuh Pakuan, captured and razed the capital.

The surviving Sunda royalties, nobles and common people fled the fallen city, heading to mountainous wilderness. After the fall of Pakuan Pajajaran, the royal regalia of Sunda Kingdom was evacuated to the eastern principality of Sumedang Larang. Among these regalias are Makuta Binokasih Sanghyang Paké, the royal crown of Sunda. Thus the member of Sunda dynasty established a surviving minor regional kingdom of Sumedang Larang where Sundanese aristocracy would survive for a few more centuries to come, until conquered by Mataram Sultanate in the 17th century.

To disable the authority of Sunda royal institution, Sultan of Banten seize the sacred stone of Palangka Sriman Sriwacana, and took it as a prized plunder to his capital, the port city of Banten. According to tradition, this sacred stone slab is an essential requirement for enthronement ceremony, thus disabling the surviving house of Sunda royals to properly crowned their new king.

From 1567 to 1579, under the last king Raja Mulya, also known as Prabu Surya Kencana, the kingdom declined substantially. In Carita Parahyangan, his name is Nusiya Mulya. He ruled further inland in Pulasari, Pandeglang, or precisely in Kaduhejo village, Menes Subdistrict, at the slope of Mount Palasari. The kingdom helplessly fallen apart, the royal government can not be maintained anymore, particularly after 1576 due to constant pressure from Banten, and finally collapsed completely in 1579. Thereafter, the Sultanate of Banten took over most of the former Sunda Kingdom's territory, thus ultimately put an end to a millennium of Hindu-Buddhist Dharmic civilization of West Java. By this time, Java has turned more and more Islamic. Only the kingdom of Blambangan on the eastern edge was the last surviving Hindu kingdom in Java, well until its demise in the early 18th century.

== See also ==
- History of Indonesia
- Sundanese people
- List of monarchs of Java
