= Sannaha =

Ruler in Java

Sannaha was the mother of King Sanjaya, who established the Mataram kingdom in the early 8th century CE.

Sannaha was first mentioned in the Canggal inscription (dated 732 CE). According to this inscription, she was the sister of King Sanna of Yawadvipa (Java). Sanna was a wise and virtuous king and the island of Java had long been under his rule. However, the kingdom fell into disunity after his death. Amid a period of violence and confusion, Sanjaya (Sannaha's son) ascended to the throne and established the Mataram Kingdom.

She was once again mentioned in Carita Parahyangan (a book written in the 16th century CE). According to this book, she was the granddaughter of Queen Shima of Kalingga Kingdom and daughter of Mandiminyak, the second king of Galuh. However, this book describes her to be the consort of Sanna, the third king of Galuh. It also describes Sanjaya (who later ascended the throne of Galuh) to be the son of both King Sanna and Sannaha. Historians believe that since this book was composed much later, the relation of Sanna and Sannaha has been romanticized. Nevertheless, the name of the persons and theme correspond with the historical Canggal inscription, which confirm that the manuscript was based or inspired by the historical event.

== See also ==
- Sunda Kingdom
- History of Indonesia
- Sanjaya dynasty
