= Keling =

Derogatory term for Indians in Southeast Asia

Keling (pronounced [kəliŋ]) or Kling is an exonym to denote an Indian or someone deemed to have originated from South India. Originally a neutral term, since the mid-20th century it has been considered derogatory and an ethnic slur, and it is sometimes euphemistically referred to as the K-word. The term is used in parts of Southeast Asia, particularly the Malay Archipelago where there are a significant Tamil diaspora – specifically Malaysia, Indonesia, Singapore and Brunei – but cognates exist in neighbouring countries as well.

Although the early definition was neutral and linked to the historical Kalinga kingdom, it is now generally considered offensive by Indians in Southeast Asia. In Brunei, the word Kaling was not considered to be pejorative, but due to media influence from Malaysia, the majority of Bruneians now tend to avoid using it. In modern usage it is not commonly capitalised. The term has also been used based on skin tone (colourism) whereby it is more likely to be used against visibly darker-skinned Indians.

== Etymology ==
The word Keling derives from the ancient Indian kingdom of Kalinga. According to political scientist Sudama Misra, the Kalinga janapada originally comprised the area covered by the Puri and Ganjam districts.

While this was apparently sometimes localized as Kalingga (as in the Indonesian Kalingga Kingdom), the terminal schwa sound was dropped in common usage to form Keling. Though ostensibly denoting the Kalinga kingdom, the term Keling in ancient Southeast Asia came to be a more general term for India and its people. The Khmer word Kleng (ក្លិង្គ) derived from the same root. Prior to the introduction of the English word "India", Keling and Jambu Dwipa were used to refer to the country in the Malay and Indonesian, while Benua Keling referred to the Indian Subcontinent.

== Usage ==
The earliest known occurrence of the word Keling appears in the Sejarah Melayu (Malay Annals). The legend mentions Raja Shulan as the king of Keling who sets out to conquer China with his descendant Raja Chulan. Scholars identify Raja Chulan with the Chola king of southern India, from whom the term Chulia derives, as in Penang's Chulia Street. Later parts of the Sejarah Melayu mention the voyages of Hang Nadim and Hang Tuah to Benua Keling (India). However Keling must not be misunderstood as a specific territory, rather it refers to people of Indian origin and not only the inhabitants of Kalinga. For example, a colonial-era Indonesian tradition refers to the Ramayana epic as Rama meaning "Rama the Indian". After the introduction of Islam, Keling sometimes referred specifically to Malayalee or Telugu people while Gujaratis and Indo-Aryan peoples from Pakistan were often confused with Parsi or Persians.

The Dutch used the words "Clings" and "Klingers" to refer to the Indian inhabitants of Malacca. The British colonial writings also use the word "Kling" to describe the immigrants from Gujarat Presidency and Coromandel coast. John Crawfurd (1856) mentioned that the term "Kling" was used by the Malays and the Javanese as "a general term for all the people of Hindustan (North India), and for the country India itself".

The 16th-century Portuguese traveller Castanheda wrote of the Keling community in Melaka in the period between 1528 and 1538:

In the northern part [of the city of Malacca] live merchants known as Quelins [Klings — a name applied to South Indians]; in this part the town is much larger than at any other. There are at Malacca, many foreign merchants ...

In its early usage Keling was a neutral term for people of Indian Muslim origin, but was perceived negatively beginning in the 20th century due to various socio-political factors. From the mid-1900s, words denoting ethnic origin were used derogatively in Malay to imply immigrant status. Consequently, more neutral language was adopted. This can be observed in the book Cherita Jenaka, where the term orang Keling (Keling people) in the 1960 edition was changed to orang India Muslim (Indian Muslim people) in the 1963 edition.

The phrases Keling-a (Hokkien; 吉寧仔; POJ: Ki-lêng-á), Keling-yan (Cantonese; 吉寧人; Yale: gat-lìhng-yan),(Hakka; 吉靈仔 git-lin-zai); and Keling-kia (Teochew) are frequently used within the Chinese community in Malaysia, Brunei, and Singapore. The Hokkien and Teochew suffixes -a and -kia are diminutives, oftentimes used to refer to children, while the Cantonese "-yan" means "people".

=== Cambodia ===
In Cambodia, the slang term for Indian people is Kleng (ក្លិង្គ), also derived from the kingdom of Kalinga and cognate with the Malay Keling or Kling. It may also be used as a nickname for people who have stereotypically Indian features such as big eyes and dark skin.

=== Indonesia ===
Traditionally in Indonesia, Keling is linked with India while Kalingga refers to the 6th century Kalingga Kingdom, which ultimately derived from the Indian Kalinga kingdom. In modern colloquial Indonesian, it is sometimes used to refer to any dark-skinned person of Indian descent, stereotypically associated with South Indians; this usage is considered offensive.

=== Malaysia ===
The word Keling has been used variously within the Malay community to mean an Indian Muslim, but now it is used more to refer to any Indian. The title "Kapitan Keling" was used for a representative of an Indian community, similar to the "Kapitan Cina" of a Chinese community. In early Penang of the 1790s the Kapitan Keling was Cauder Mohideen who, together with the Kapitan Cina Koh Lay Huan and other prominent members of the community, formed the first Committee of Assessors to decide the rates and collection of taxes. This usage is preserved is the name of the Kapitan Keling Mosque, a prominent Penang landmark.

In some modern cases Keling is used as a derogatory term. It was used in 2005 by Members of Parliament in Malaysia because of misconception about Indian Muslim ethnics, which resulted in an uproar accusing the MPs of racism.

Recently, social media slang had given rise to a more subtle word for this slur, "Type K", in which the K stands for the K-word slur like in "Type M" and "Type C".

The definition of the word may vary from one Malaysian state to another. In Kedah, for example, the term is mainly used to refer to Muslims of Indian descent (In Selangor, the word Mamak is used to refer to an Indian Muslim).

=== Philippines ===
For the southern Philippines, it has been suggested that the sobriquet "Kiling", which referred to the name of a local Rajah (Rajah Kiling of Butuan), is not Visayan in origin but rather, Indian, because Kiling refers to the people of India among the Mindanaoans.

=== Singapore ===
In Singapore, Chulia Street was formerly known as Kling Street. Its original name is due to the large numbers of Indians from southern India known as ‘men from Kalinga’, or ‘orang kling’ in Malay who had congregated in the area. After Indian convicts were transported to Singapore, the term ‘kling’ was considered a derogatory association with Indians and the street was renamed to Chulia Street, with Chulia being the north Indian term for the Kalinga kingdom.

During the 2025 Singaporean general election, Singapore Democratic Party's (SDP) candidate Gigene Wong called her fellow SDP candidate Ariffin Sha a "keling kia", believing it to be a "neutral term that Hokkien speakers use to refer to Indians", during a campaign rally. The public took offence to the derogatory term and Wong acknowledged and apologised for her use of the term with the SDP issuing a public apology at the end of a campaign rally.

=== Thailand ===
The equivalent of Keling in the Thai language is Khaek (แขก). It is a generic term referring to anyone from South Asia. The term generally has no negative connotation and is used even in polite or formal communication. However, outside influence and confusion with Mughals and Indian Muslims has broadened the meaning in modern times to include certain predominantly Muslims communities, particularly Persians and Arabs. This extended meaning is considered inaccurate and at times rejected as derogatory, especially by Thai Muslims, but has become increasingly widespread.

== Names of places ==
Various place names in Malaysia contain the word Keling for historical reasons, e.g. Tanjong Keling., Kampong Keling, and Bukit Keling, etc.

In Penang, the Kapitan Keling Mosque, situated on the corner of Buckingham Street and Jalan Masjid Kapitan Keling (Pitt Street), is one of the oldest mosques in George Town. Various other Penang Hokkien street names contain the word Keling, e.g. Kiet-leng-a Ban-san (Chowrasta Road), Kiet-leng-a Ke (King Street/Market Street). In Malacca, another mosque also uses the word Kling, Kampung Kling Mosque.

In Singapore, there is a road in Jurong Industrial Estate called Tanjong Kling Road which is probably derived from the word 'Keling'. Chulia Street was formerly known as Kling Street.

In Jepara Regency, Central Java, Indonesia, there is a district called Keling. Locals link the location with the 6th century Kalingga Kingdom. In Surabaya, East Java, Indonesia, there is a place called "Pacar Keling", referring to the "Indian" henna plant (Lawsonia inermis) to differentiate with almost similar look alike plant called "Pacar Cina" (Aglaia odorata). The words "Kampung Keling" (Lit. Keling Village) Is also commonly used by the locals on various cities across Indonesia the denote an Indian settlement both during the Colonial era and within modern day Indonesia.

== See also ==
- List of regions of India

Maritime history

- Kaling invasion of Southeast Asia
- Kalinga historical region of India
- Kalingga Hindu Kingdom of Indonesia
- Kalinga province of Philippines
- Kalinga alphabet of India
