= Tulodong =

King of Mataram
- Reign: 919 – 924
- Predecessor: Rakai Hino Sri Daksottama
- Successor: Mpu Wagiswara
- Born: Dyah Tulodong
Regnal name
- Sri Maharaja Rakai Layang Dyah Tlodhong Sri Sajjana Sanmatanuragattunggadeva (Lintakan inscription)
- House: Sanjaya
- Father: Rakai Watukura Dyah Balitung
- Religion: Shivaist Hinduism

Sri Maharaja Rakai Layang Dyah Tulodong was a maharaja of the Mataram kingdom of Central Java who succeeded Daksha and reigned for from 919 to either 924 or 928 AD. Historians have posited that Tulodong was the son of Balitung whose reign ended about eight years prior to the start of Tulodong's.

Tulodong was likely a political outsider as he was not recorded as a member of the government of his predecessor. He was succeeded by Rake Pangkaya Wawa who assumed power by February 928.
