= Kapitan Keling Mosque =

Mosque in George Town, Penang, Malaysia

- Masjid Kapitan Keling مسجد کاڤيتن کليڠ 甲必丹吉灵清真寺 காப்பித்தான் கெலிங மசூதி
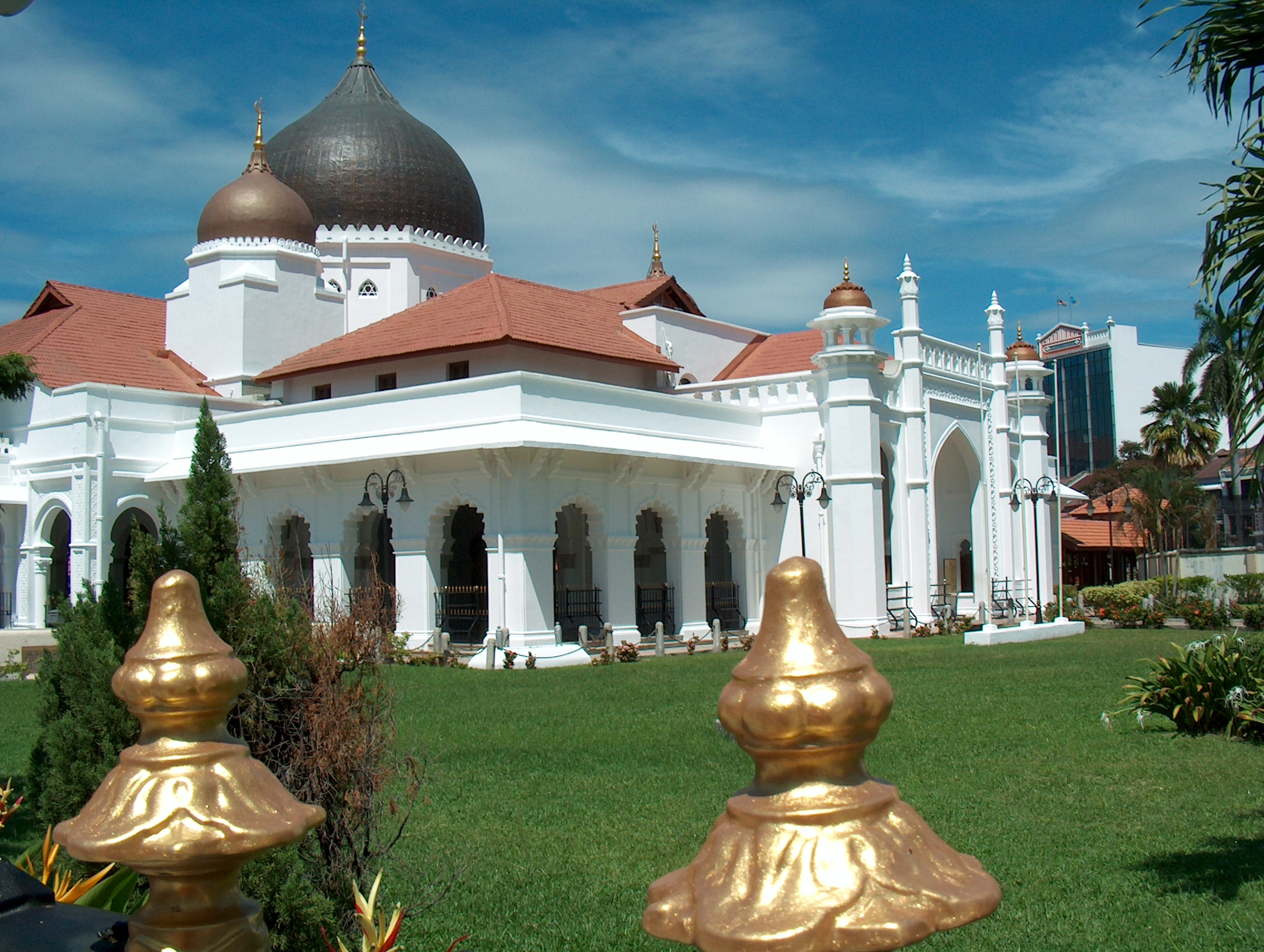

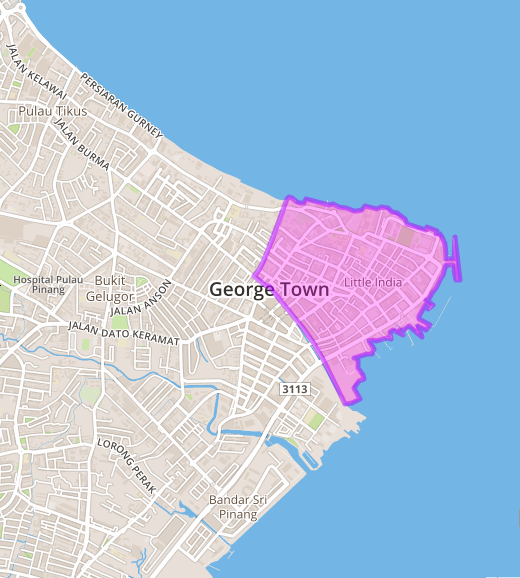
- Location within central George Town, Penang

Religion
- Affiliation: Islam

Location
- Location: George Town, Penang, Malaysia
- Interactive map of Kapitan Keling Mosque
- Administration: Penang Islamic Council
- Coordinates: 5°25′00.0″N 100°20′14.6″E

Architecture
- Style: Islamic, Mughal, Moorish
- Founder: Cauder Mohuddeen Merican
- Completed: 1801

The Kapitan Keling Mosque (Malay: Masjid Kapitan Keling, Tamil: காப்பித்தான் கெலிங மசூதி, romanized: Kāppittāṉ Keliṅa Macūti) is a mosque built in the 19th century by Indian Muslim traders in George Town, Penang, Malaysia. It is situated on the corner of Buckingham Street (Lebuh Buckingham) and Pitt Street (Jalan Masjid Kapitan Keling). Being a prominent Islamic historic centre, it is part of the World Heritage Site of George Town and lies at the centre of the city's Tamil Muslim neighbourhood, the chulias. It is the first permanent Muslim institution to have been established in the area, dating from the early 1800s. Cauder Mohuddeen Merican is known as the founder of the mosque and leader of the Chulias. In 1801 Sir George Leith, who was then Lieutenant Governor of Penang, appointed a prominent Indian Muslim leader, Cauder Mohudeen, as Captain of the South Indian “Keling” community. He granted a piece of land to build a mosque on the south side of Malabar Street (Chulia Street). Cauder Mohudeen (born c. 1759) was a ship mandoor or foreman from Porto Novo, which the Tamils called Parangipettai and the Muslims Mahmudbandar, about 50 kilometres south of Pondicherry in India. He was referred to as 'Kapitan Kling'.

"Keling" is a Malay term for people of Indian origin, nowadays considered offensive but not so considered at the time when the mosque was built. The "Kapitan" was a representative of the Indian community, like the "Kapitan Cina" for the Chinese community.

Another renovation in 1930 gave the Kapitan Keling Mosque its present appearance after the previous design was deemed impractical. In keeping with tradition, the mosque was not rebuilt, but only enlarged. Among the major work during this period included doubling the height of the central prayer hall, improvement to the ventilation system, and allowing more natural light to enter. The exterior is ochre yellowed while the interior had white marble floors and a high ceiling. The interior aisles are formed by a series of horseshoe arches, crowned with King Edward's plaques. The façade of the building and its interior were decorated with geometric designs, as human and animal forms are forbidden in Islam.

== See also ==
- Islam in Malaysia
