= Sanghyang Tapak inscription =

Old Javanese inscription

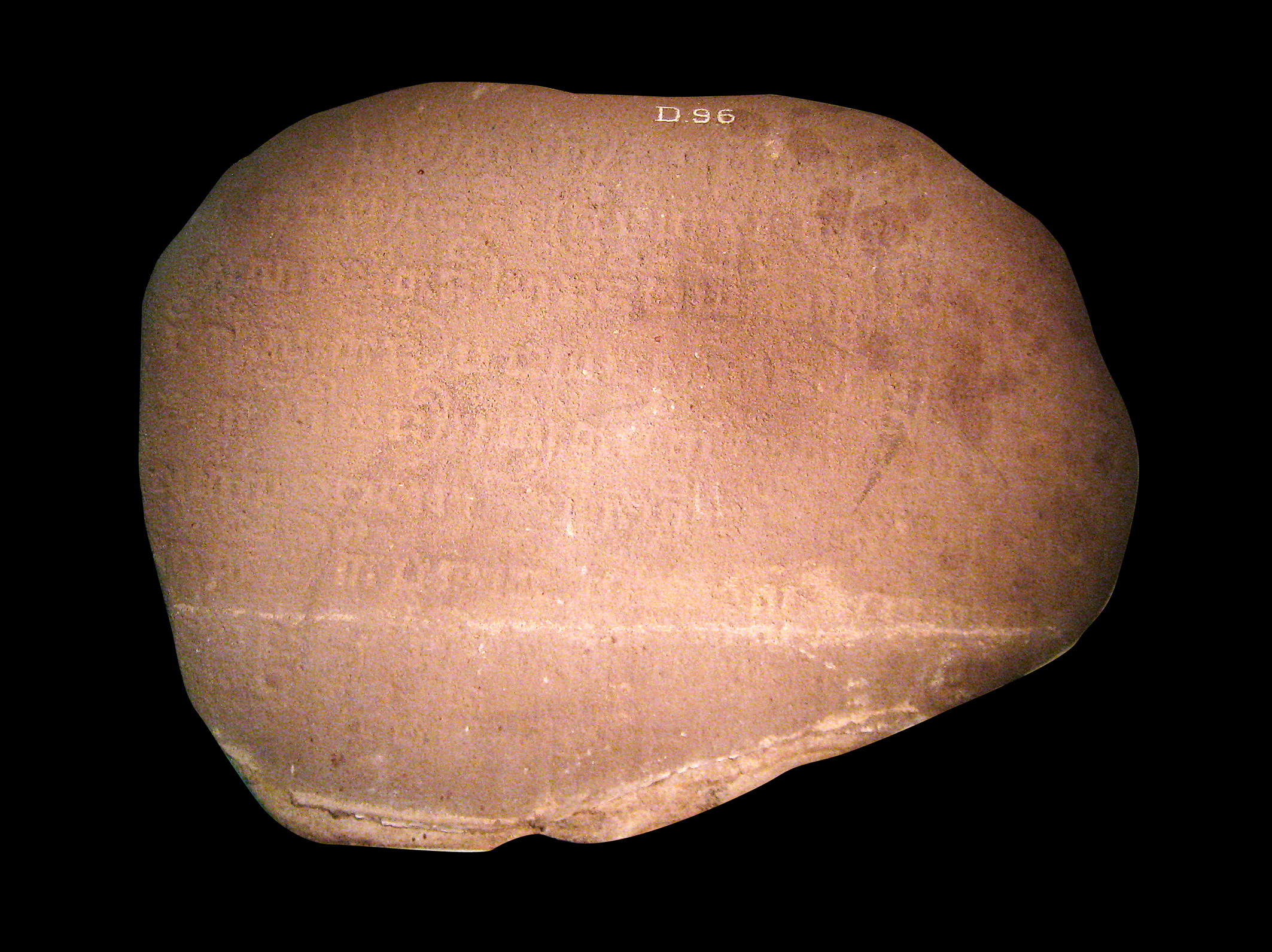
- Inscription No. D96, one of the four Sanghyang Tapak stone inscriptions, also known as Jayabupati inscription or Cicatih inscription
- Material: Stone
- Writing: Kawi script
- Created: 952 saka (1030 CE)
- Discovered: Cicatih River bank in Cibadak, Sukabumi, West Java, Indonesia
- Present location: National Museum of Indonesia, Jakarta
- Registration: D.72, D.96, D.97, D.98
- Language: Old Javanese

The Sanghyang Tapak inscription (also known as Jayabupati inscription or Cicatih inscription) is an ancient inscription dated from 952 saka (1030 CE), consisting of 40 lines requiring 4 pieces of stone to write on. The inscription mentioned the establishment of a protected sacred area called Sanghyang Tapak by the King of Sunda named Jayabhupati.

These 4 stones are found in the Cicatih River bank in Cibadak, Sukabumi, West Java. Three were found near Kampung Bantar Muncang, while one was found near Kampung Pangcalikan. The inscriptions are written in the ancient Javanese Kawi script. Now the four inscriptions are stored at the National Museum of Indonesia, with codes D 73 (Cicatih), D 96, D 97, and D 98.

== Contents ==
The contents of the first three inscriptions (according to Pleyte):

D 73: //O// Swasti shakawarsatita 952 karttikamasa tithi dwadashi shuklapa-ksa. ha. ka. ra. wara tambir. iri- ka diwasha nira prahajyan sunda ma-haraja shri jayabhupati jayamana- hen wisnumurtti samarawijaya shaka-labhuwanamandaleswaranindita harogowardhana wikra-mottunggadewa, ma-

D 96: gaway tepek i purwa sanghyang tapak ginaway denira shri jayabhupati prahajyan sunda. mwang tan hanani baryya baryya shila. irikang lwah tan pangalapa ikan sesini lwah. Makahingan sanghyang tapak wates kapujan i hulu, i sor makahingan ia sanghyang tapak wates kapujan i wungkalagong kalih matangyan pinagawayaken pra-sasti pagepageh. mangmang sapatha.

D 97: sumpah denira prahajyan sunda. lwirnya nihan.

== Translation ==
Peace and well-being. In the year of Saka 952, Kartika month on the 12th day of the light part, Hariang day, Kaliwon, first day, Wuku Tambir. Today is the day that the king of Sunda Maharaja Sri Jayabupati Jayamanahen Wisnumurti Samarawijaya Sakalabuwanamandaleswaranindita Haro Gowardhana Wikramottunggadewa, makes his marks on the Eastern part of Sanghiyang Tapak. Made by Sri Jayabupati King of Sunda. And may there be nobody allowed to break this law. In this part of the river catching fish is forbidden, in the sacred area of Sanghyang Tapak near the source of the river. Up until the border of sacred Sanghyang Tapak is marked by two big trees. So this inscription is made, enforced with an oath.

The oath of the king is written on the fourth inscription (D 98). Consisting of 20 lines, the oath is an invocation of all supernatural powers, and deities (hyang) from heavens and earth to protect and support the king's mandate. Whoever breaks the law would be punished by these supernatural beings, and die such as their brain being sucked, blood being drunk, disembowelment, and their chest being split in two. This inscription is closed by the words, "I wruhhanta kamung hyang kabeh" (O being known by thee.., all the spirits).

== Inscription's date ==
The date of the Jayabupati inscription is suggested to be October 11, 1030. According to Pustaka Nusantara, Parwa III sarga 1, Sri Jayabupati reigned for 12 years (952–964) saka (1030–1042 AD). Strangely the style of the inscriptions reveals an East Javanese style of script. Not only letters, language, and style, but the noble name of the king is similar to royal names in Dharmawangsa's court. Sri Jayabupati in Carita Parahyangan is mentioned as Prabu Detya Maharaja. He is the 20th king of Sunda after Tarusbawa.
