= Kapitan Keling =

High-ranking government position in the civil administration

Historically, a Kapitan Keling was appointed by European authorities to govern local Indian communities in colonial territories in Southeast Asia, similar to the more widespread office of the "Kapitan Cina" for the Chinese community. "Keling" is a Malay term for people of Indian origin, nowadays considered offensive but was not so regarded historically.

Cauder Mohideen was the first Kapitan Keling of Penang. In 1795, Mohideen, Kapitan Cina Koh Lay Huan, and other prominent members of the newly founded Penang community formed the first Committee of Assessors to decide on the municipal rates and collection of taxes.

The name of Kapitan Keling Mosque, founded by Indian Muslim traders in 1801 and still a prominent Penang landmark, preserves the memory of this office.

== See also ==
- Kapitan Arab
- Kapitan Cina
