= Keling, Jepara =

Keling is a kecamatan (district) in Jepara Regency, Central Java, Indonesia.

== History ==
The name of this district is traditionally linked with the 6th century Indianized kingdom of Kalingga, which ultimately derived from ancient Indian kingdom of Kalinga.

== Kelurahan (administrative village) ==
1. Bumiharjo
2. Damarwulan
3. Tempur
4. Gelang
5. Jlegong
6. Kaligarang
7. Kelet
8. Keling
9. Klepu
10. Kunir
11. Tunahan
12. Watuaji

== Tourism ==
- Islamic tomb of Syekh Siti Jenar, di Kelet
- Angin temple, in Tempur
- Bubrah temple, in Tempur
- Beringin Beach, in Bumiharjo
- Blorong Cave, in Damarwulan
- Watu Ombo, in Damarwulan
- Kedung Pancur Telu Waterfall, in Damarwulan
- Curug Kemiri Waterfall, in Damarwulan
- Curug Kyai Buku Waterfall, in Damarwulan
- City of Stone (Kota Batu), in Watuaji

== Economy ==
Keling district is known as a coffee bean plantation and production center in Central Java. In Damarwulan village, silk farms are the home industry, while in Keling village, there is a kapok silk cotton production area. There are three marketplaces in Keling district, the Pasar Keling, Pasar Kelet, and Keling animal market.

== List of important places ==
- Kelet Hospital
- Puskesmas Keling 1, in Kelet
- Puskesmas Keling 2, in Keling
