= Koh Lay Huan =

Personal details
- Born: Fujian, China
- Died: 1826
- Spouse(s): Saw It Neoh, Guan Boey Neoh
- Children: 11

Kapitan China Koh Lay Huan (simplified Chinese: 辜礼欢; traditional Chinese: 辜禮歡; pinyin: Gū Lǐhuān; Pe̍h-ōe-jī: Ko͘ Lé-hoan; died 1826) was a wealthy and educated man, who had earlier rebelled against the Manchu-led Chinese Qing dynasty and fled to Siam and the Malay States, to eventually settle in Penang as its first Kapitan China. He was a merchant, planter, tax farmer, Chinese secret society headman, and one of a handful of pioneering leaders of Penang.

== Early life ==
Koh Lay Huan was from T'ung-an county, Zhang Zhou Prefecture in the Fujian Province, on the southeast coast of China. At the time, Fujian was at the focus of the activities of Tiandihui (Heaven and Earth Society), a secret society aiming at the overthrow of the Manchu-led Chinese Qing Dynasty. Having become involved in rebellious activity, Koh Lay Huan was forced to flee to the south part of Siam, where he settled successfully.

He became a close ally of the headman/penghulu of Nakhon Srithammarat (who would, around 1821, marry one of Koh's daughters in Penang). Later, encouraged by commercial prospects, he moved to Kedah where he again settled successfully, kept a second family, and became Kapitan Cina of Kedah at Kuala Muda.

== Participation in the founding of Penang ==
In 1786 Francis Light claimed the island of Pulau Pinang on behalf of the King of England and renamed it Prince of Wales Island. There were only about a hundred Malay fishermen inhabiting the island at that time, but the population would grow fast - to 5,000 in 1789 and 10,000 ten years later.

Koh Lay Huan had a share in that success. Already a shortly time after Light arrived, Koh Lay Huan came to visit him and brought with him, from Kuala Muda, Kedah, several boatloads of Chinese and Malays to clear the land, inhabit, trade and generally develop the island. At their inaugural meeting, Koh presented Light with a present of some fishing nets. In May 1787 Light appointed Koh as the first Kapitan Cina of Penang.

Light respected Koh's canniness, enterprise and social and political acumen and connections. He was recorded to have said about Koh, "Tuanka (towkay) China is an old fox. He has little to do with the government but being rich and having married a daughter of the old King he bears a considerable sway in their Becharas or Council" By appointing Koh Kapitan China, Light had gained an able administrator and judge.

Koh was known as Chewan in official documents. He was also known as Koh Lay Hwan, Cheki, Chu Khee, Ku Li-huan and Patcan.

Today, Koh Lay Huan's original residence has been restored and is now a boutique hotel (The East Indies Mansion) at 25 Lebuh China (China Street) in George Town, Penang.

== And Origin of Penang's Municipal Assessments ==
In 1795, Light's business partner, James Scott, sought representation when it was decided that properties should be taxed, the revenue being needed to fund the police force, maintain roads and ensure cleanliness. It was at this time that Kapitan Cina Koh Lay Huan, his counterpart for the Indian community (Kapitan Keling) Cauder Mohideen, and other prominent members of the community, formed the first Committee of Assessors to decide the rates and collection of taxes (assessments).

== Aceh Links and Pepper Cultivation ==
Cultivation of pepper in Penang began through the initial effort of Francis Light and Koh Lay Huan.

Koh had been involved with pepper cultivation already long before his arrival at Penang, having had experience in this field both in Phuket and in Kedah. This was facilitated by his being well connected with the English- and French-speaking Sultan of Acheh, Jauhar al-Alam. At the time, Aceh accounted for a large part of the worldwide production of pepper. In 1790 Francis Light sent Koh to Acheh to gather pepper plants for cultivation in Penang.

Koh retained his connection with the Acheh Sultan Jauhar al-Alam and around 1819 helped him to put down a rebellion by Achenese territorial chiefs.

== Descendants ==
Koh would go on to found a kongsi. His descendants played a major role in the Penang-Kedah Chinese community for generations.

He had six sons and two daughters by Saw It Neoh, his wife in Penang, and two sons and one daughter by Guan Boey Neoh, his wife in Kedah. His daughter, Luan, the wife of the headman/penghulu of Nakhon Srithammarat, later became the mother of the governors of Phang Nga and Takuapa, who financially supported Khaw Su Chiang's successful tax monopolies in those provinces and who with the support of this powerful lady later became the governor of Rating in 1844.

Koh's eldest son, Koh Kok Chye, was from his Penang wife and was promoted to be the governor of Kuala Kedah (1821–1841). Another son accompanied Sir Stamford Raffles to Singapore at its foundation in 1819. Koh Lay Huan's son also served as Raja of Pungah in Ligor, and Agent for the Chau Phya of Ligor.

His famous descendants also include Koh Teng Choon, the planter and Teng Choon's son, Koh Seang Tat who together with Foo Tye Sin operated the successful firm of Tye Sin Tat & Co.

A descendant of Koh Seang Teik (younger brother of Koh Seang Tat) was Koh Lip Cheng and Koh Lip Teng (Queens scholar of Penang Free School).

One more famous descendant of Koh Lip Cheng was Datuk Koh Sin Hock (DSPN, AMN, OBE, JP) who was actively in the Malayan politics under both the British and the Japanese.

Another descendant of Koh was Gu Hongming, a Scottish-educated conservative Confucian cultural critic serving in minor Chinese government positions during the end of the Qing dynasty.

== See also ==
- Light Street & Pitt Street Walking Tour - Part 2
- Southeast Asian Urbanism: The Meaning and Power of Social Space By Evers, Hans-Dieter Evers, Rüdiger Korff Published by LIT Verlag Berlin-Hamburg-Münster, 2000; ISBN 3-8258-4021-2, ISBN 978-3-8258-4021-1; p. 48.
