= Sanna (king) =

Ruler in Java

Sanna was a king, who ruled Java during the early 8th century CE.

According to Canggal inscription (dated 732 CE), the island of Java had long been under the rule of this wise and virtuous king. However, the kingdom fell into disunity after his death. Amid a period of violence and confusion Sanjaya, son of Sannaha (the sister of Sanna) ascended to the throne, and established the Kingdom of Mataram.

He was named as Prabu Sanna or Bratasena in Carita Parahyangan (a book composed around late 16th-century CE). According to Carita Parahyangan, Sanna was the King of Galuh that was usurped by his cousin, Purbasora. In this book, Sanjaya is described as the son of Sanna, rather than his nephew. So, to avenge his father's defeat, Sanjaya attacked Galuh with a special force and killed Purbasora along with his family. Afterwards, Sanjaya reclaimed Sanna's kingdom and began to rule Java.

== See also ==
- Sunda Kingdom
- History of Indonesia
