= Galuh Kingdom =

Ancient Sundanese kingdom in Java

- 669 AD–1482
- The territories of the Galuh Kingdom and its neighbour the Sunda Kingdom in Western Java
- Capital: Kawali
- Common languages: Sundanese, Sanskrit
- Religion: Hinduism, Buddhism, Sunda Wiwitan
- Government: Monarchy
- Maharaja, Prabu
- History
  - Separation from Tarumanagara by Wretikandayun: 669 AD
  - Unification of Sunda and Galuh: 1482
- Currency: Native gold and silver coins
Preceded by	Succeeded by
Tarumanagara	Sunda Kingdom

Cangkuang temple

The Galuh Kingdom was a medieval Sundanese kingdom located in the eastern part of Tatar Sunda (now West Java province and Banyumasan region of Central Java province), present-day Indonesia. It was established as a breakaway kingdom of the Tarumanagara around the 669 AD. Traditionally the kingdom was associated with the Central & Eastern Parahyangan cultural regions, with territory spanning from Citarum River in the west, to Cipamali and Cisarayu River in the east. Its capital was first located in Karangkamulyan, Ciamis Regency, then Saunggalah, Kuningan and Kawali, north of present-day Ciamis.

== Etymology ==
The etymology of "galuh" is Old Sundanese and Kawi word for "gemstone". Other version stated galuh is derived from Sanskrit which means silver.

== History ==
Most of the knowledge about this kingdom was collected from local Sundanese myths and folktales, transmitted through Pantun Sunda oral tradition. The Sundanese epic folktale of Ciung Wanara took place in this kingdom. Scarce historical records include Carita Parahyangan and Wangsakerta manuscripts were composed in the later period. The only stone inscription left by this kingdom was the 14th-century Astana Gede inscription discovered in Kawali, believed to be the former capital of Galuh. From all these sources, it was concluded that Galuh was a Hindu kingdom, the predecessor of the later Sunda Kingdom which was centered in Pajajaran. The Kingdom timespan was about the same period as the Javanese kingdoms starts from Kalingga until the era of Majapahit.

According to the Wangsakerta manuscript, Galuh was a vassal of Tarumanagara. After the fall of Tarumanagara, its dynastic patriarch, Wretikandayun of Galuh, separated his realm from the Sunda kingdom in the west. Since the crown prince of Galuh was the son-in-law of Queen Shima of Kalingga, a Hindu kingdom in Central Java, Wretikandayun, supported by Kalingga, demanded that the remnant of what was known as Tarumanagara's territory be divided into two kingdoms. Finding himself in an unfortunate position and unwilling to risk a civil war, King Tarusbawa of Sunda granted Wretikandayun's demand. In 670, Tarumanagara was divided into two kingdoms: the Sunda Kingdom in the west, and the Galuh Kingdom in the east, separated by the Tarum (Citarum) River.

Galuh continued to exist as an individual kingdom as the counterpart of Sunda until it was absorbed and incorporated within the Sunda kingdom around the 10th century. Galuh and the Sunda kingdom, another Sundanese kingdom, established the United Kingdom of Sunda and Galuh. Its centre in Kawali became the court capital until the 15th century when Sri Baduga Maharaja shifted the capital to Pakuan Pajajaran. In the later period, during the expansion of the Mataram Sultanate, the menak (nobles) of the Eastern Priangan region (Ciamis, Tasikmalaya, Garut, Kuningan, and Majalengka), claimed to hold the legacy and prestige of this ancient kingdom.

=== Second kingdom ===
A new independent polity called Galuh which was different than the first entity emerged in the 16th century with its center in Panaekan. In 1595, this Galuh kingdom, then ruled by Cipta Permana, was conquered by Mataram Sultanate. His son Adipati Panaekan was appointed wedana (district chief) by Mataram administration suggesting the end of this second kingdom.

== Capitals ==
In the 6th century, the capital of the Galuh kingdom was located in Bojong Galuh (the area now known as Karangkamulyan). By the 13th century, the kingdom’s capital had shifted to Kawali. Sri Baduga Maharaja moved the capital from Kawali to Pakuan Pajajaran after marrying the daughter of the Sunda kingdom’s ruler, an event that effectively united the two kingdoms.

== Cultural heritage ==
Cangkuang temple located in Leles, Garut Regency is estimated to have been built during the Galuh kingdom era. It is the only reconstructed Hindu temple in West Java.

== List of monarchs ==
Name	Reign	Birth	Notes
Wretikandayun	612-702	591	Reigned before as King of Kendan. Relocated capital to Karangmulyan after Galuh separated from Sunda
Mandiminyak	702-709	624	Born as Amara. Youngest son of Wretikandayun. Reigned before 702 as King of Kalingga.
Bratasena	709-716		Illegitimate son of Mandiminyak and his sister-in-law Pwah Rababu. Fled to northern Kalingga after the invasion of his half-brother Purbasora. Father of Sanjaya, King of Mataram kingdom
Purbasora	716-723	643	Eldest son of Mandiminyak and half-brother of Bratasena. Allied with Indraprasta (Cirebon) to Invade Galuh and claim its throne in 716. Killed during the invasion Sanjaya in 723
Premanadikusuma	723-732		Also known as Bagawat Sajalajala. Son of Purbasora, appointed by Sanjaya to succeed Purbasora. During his reign Galuh came under Mataram influence. Spent most of his life as a rishi in Mount Padang, Ciamis. Killed by a ploy devised by his own vicegerent Tamperan Barmawijaya in 732
Tamperan Barmawijaya	732-739		Also known as Rakeyan Panaraban. Son of Sanjaya, appointed by his father to be the vicegerent of Galuh. Became king after Premanadikusuma was killed. Killed by Manarah in 739
Manarah	739-783		Son of Premanadikusuma. Killed Tamperan Barmawijaya to avenge his father and reclaim the Galuh throne. The main subject of Sundanese folktale Ciung Wanara
Guruminda Sang Minisri	783-799		

== See also ==
- United Kingdom of Sunda and Galuh
- List of monarchs of Java

== Works cited ==
- Sofiani, Yulia (2012). R.A.A. Kusumadiningrat & R.A.A. Kusumasubrata: Gaya Hidup Bupati-bupati Galuh, 1839-1914 (in Indonesian). Yogyakarta: Ombak. p. 141. ISBN 978-602-7544-27-7.
