= Carita Parahyangan =

Carita Parahyangan (English: Tale of Parahyangan, official Sundanese script: ᮎᮛᮤᮒᮕᮛᮠᮡᮀᮍᮔ᮪) is a text contained in a single manuscript written around the late 16th century, registered as Kropak 406 from the former collection of the Bataviaasch Genootschap voor Kunsten en Wetenschappen (Batavian Society of Arts and Sciences), now in the Perpustakaan Nasional (National Library) in Jakarta. It was identified as early as 1882 by Holle as the "Carita Parahyangan", the name derived from Parahyangan highlands in West Java, originated from Sundanese words which mean "the abode of hyangs (gods)". Since that time the manuscript has received much scholarly attention.

The Carita Parahyangan tells the history of the Sunda Kingdom, from the early Galuh period in the early 8th century, during the era of Wretikandayun and King Sanjaya, until the fall of Pakuan Pajajaran in the 16th century, the capital of Sunda kingdom under invasion by the Banten Sultanate assisted by the Cirebon and Demak Sultanates.

The manuscript consists of 47 leaves of lontar palm leaf manuscript measuring 21 by 3 cm (8.3 by 1.2 in); each leaf contains four lines, written in Old Sundanese script in Old Sundanese language.

== Content and translations ==
This manuscript consists of two parts. The larger part, the Carita Parahyangan proper, is a text on Sundanese kings and kingdoms from the pre-Islamic period. After earlier publication by Holle (1882a) and Pleyte (1914a) it was Poerbatjaraka /91919-21) who gave a complete transliteration of the manuscript. In 1962 Noorduyn (1962a, 1962b) devoted two important papers to the texts; in the first he managed to restore the order of the folio of the manuscript which was in disarray; in the second he gave an annotated transliteration and translation of the first part of the text. In a third paper, Noorduyn (1966) published several additions and corrections to the earlier text edition, which were based on a careful rereading of the original manuscript.

Based on Noorduyn's restoration of the order of the leaves in the major part of the manuscript, a new transliteration, with a translation in Indonesian and notes, was published by Atja and Danasasmita (1981c). In 1995 Darsa and Ekadjati presented a new edition and translation of the manuscript. In this work, the other part of the manuscript, called by the editor Fragmen Carita Parahyangan, was published for the first time. This is a text found on 13 leaves (lempir) or 25 “pages”; graphically the two texts are different insofar as the Fragment has an irregular number of lines (3-6) per page, unlike the Carita Parahyangan proper which consistently has four lines writing per page. Moreover, there are minor scriptural differences between the two parts of the manuscript. The Fragment contains “three main stories of rulers of Sunda kingdom with the capital city of Pakuan Pajajaran”. Its second, larger part is quite interesting from the viewpoint of social and economic history (Darsa and Ekadjati 1995:6). In a more recent paper Darsa (1999) discussed in more detail the relation between the two texts in Kropak 406; it is clear that at an early stage the two texts must have been brought together in a single manuscript.

== See also ==
- Sunda Kingdom
- Sunda Wiwitan
