= Ciliwung =

River in Java, Indonesia

Ci Liwung Sungai Ciliwung, Tji Liwoeng, Tjiliwoeng, Tjiliwung
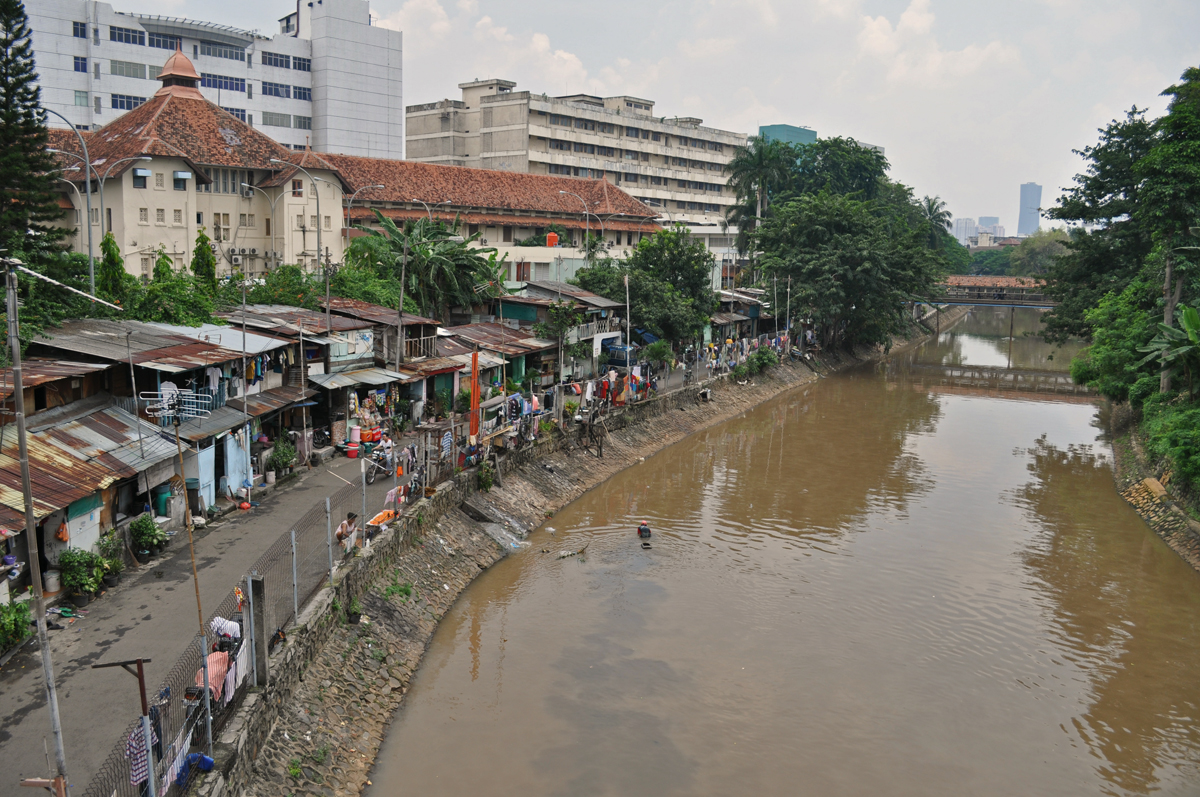
- Lower Ci Liwung at Jakarta

- Location within Java Location within Indonesia

Location
- Country: Indonesia
- Provinces: West Java, Jakarta
- Cities: Jakarta, Depok, Bogor

Physical characteristics
- Source
  - location: Mount Pangrango, Bogor Regency, West Java, Indonesia
  - coordinates: 6°44′23″S 106°56′59″E
  - elevation: 3,002 m (9,849 ft)
- Mouth
  - location: North Jakarta, Jakarta, Indonesia
  - coordinates: 6°07′00″S 106°49′42″E
  - elevation: 0 m (0 ft)
- Length: 119 km (74 mi)
- Basin size: 375 km^{2} (145 sq mi)

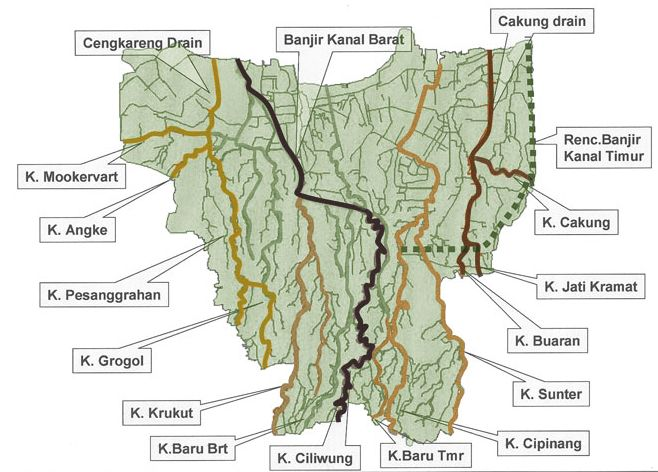
Ci Liwung ("K. Ciliwung "), bottom center in the map of rivers and canals of Jakarta (2012)

The Ciliwung (often written as Ci Liwung as the "ci" prefix simply translates as "river"; also as Tjiliwoeng in Dutch, Sundanese: ᮎᮤᮜᮤᮝᮥᮀ) is a 119-kilometre-long (74 mi) river in the northwestern region of Java where it flows through two provinces, West Java and the special region of Jakarta. The natural estuary of the Ciliwung, known as the Kali Besar ("Big River"), was an important strategic point for trade in the precolonial and colonial periods and was instrumental in the founding of the port city of Jakarta, but has been lost from a reorganization of the watercourse of the rivers around the area into canals.

== Etymology ==
The etymology of Ciliwung is uncertain; the initial syllable "ci" means "river"; of the "liwung" part, the two least implausible assumptions are "the whirlpool" (compare Sundanese liwung "be distressed, upset") or "the meandering one" (compare Malay liuk, liut "to twist"). It is possible that the name originated from one of the many epithets of the king of Pajajaran Sri Baduga Maharaja, among them is Prabu Haliwung, so named because of his temperamental attitude. The name "Ci Haliwung" was recorded on the map of C.M. Pleyte (1919).

== Geography ==
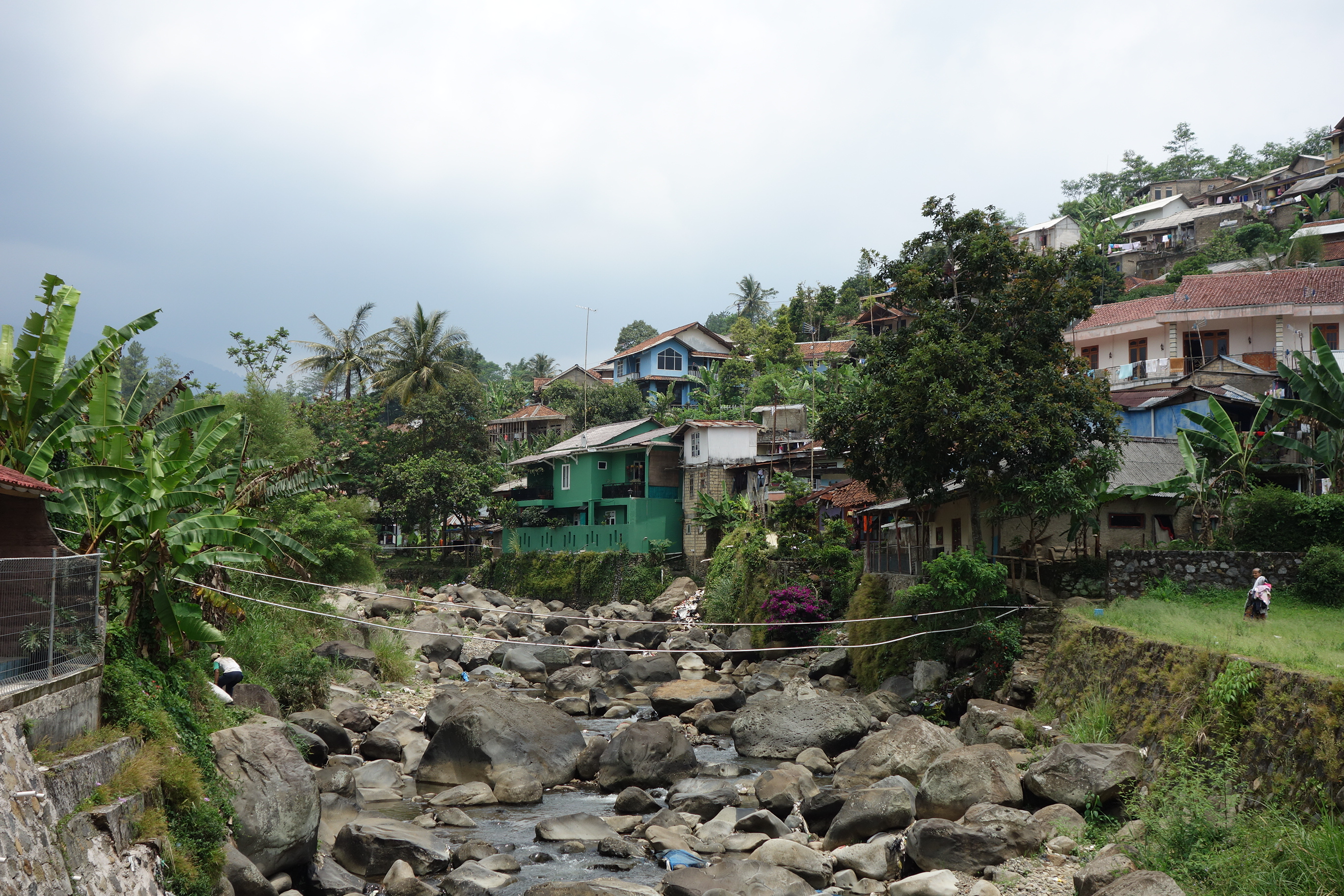
Upper Ciliwung near its source in the Puncak area.

The Ci Liwung is 119 km long with a catchment area of 476 km^{2}. The Ciliwung has its source at Mandalawangi in Bogor Regency with the highest peak at 3,002 m. The river flows in a northern direction passing several active volcanoes, Mount Salak, Mount Kendeng, and Mount Halimun, and crosses two main cities Bogor and Jakarta before finally flowing into the Java Sea through Jakarta Bay. The main tributaries in the upper catchment area are the Ciesek and Ciluar with respective lengths of 9.7 km and 21.0 km, with catchment areas of 27.15 km^{2} and 35.25 km^{2} respectively.

The Ciliwung basin has a narrow and elongated shape. The 17.2-kilometre length of the upstream area has a very steep slope (0.08), The 25.4-kilometre length in the middle-reach has a slope of 0.01, and the downstream, 55 km in length, has a flat slope of 0.0018. In general, the geology the upstream of Ciliwung basin is dominated by Tuffaceous Breccia and older deposits of lahar and lava. The middle reach consists mainly of Quaternary period alluvial fans and volcanic rocks. The downstream area is dominated by alluvial and beach ridge deposits.

Mean rainfall reaches 3,125 mm, with a mean annual discharge of 16 m^{3}/s as measured at Ciliwung Ratujaya observation station (231 km^{2}). With such topographical, geological, and hydrological features, the Ciliwung River is often overflowing and inundating parts of Jakarta. The population along the Ciliwung River basin reaches 4.088 million (Census 2000) which can be regarded as the most densely populated area.

=== Jakarta's canal ===
The natural flow of the Ciliwung was diverted into canals by the Dutch during the early settlement of Jakarta (then named Batavia). Beginning in an area that is now Istiqlal Mosque, the Ciliwung was diverted into two canals, one flowing northwest and one flowing northeast.

The western branch flows along the canal of Jalan Veteran and then through the canal of Jalan Gajah Mada. This 2 km straight canal is known as Batang Hari Canal, previously known as Molenvliet, which was dug in the 17th century. Formerly the water branches into two directions in Glodok, following the two courses that are now Jalan Pancoran and Jalan Pinangsia Raya; today the water from Batang Hari canal was diverted east before Lindeteves Trade Center. Eventually, the water ends up in Sunda Kelapa harbor after passing through the canals of Jakarta Old Town.

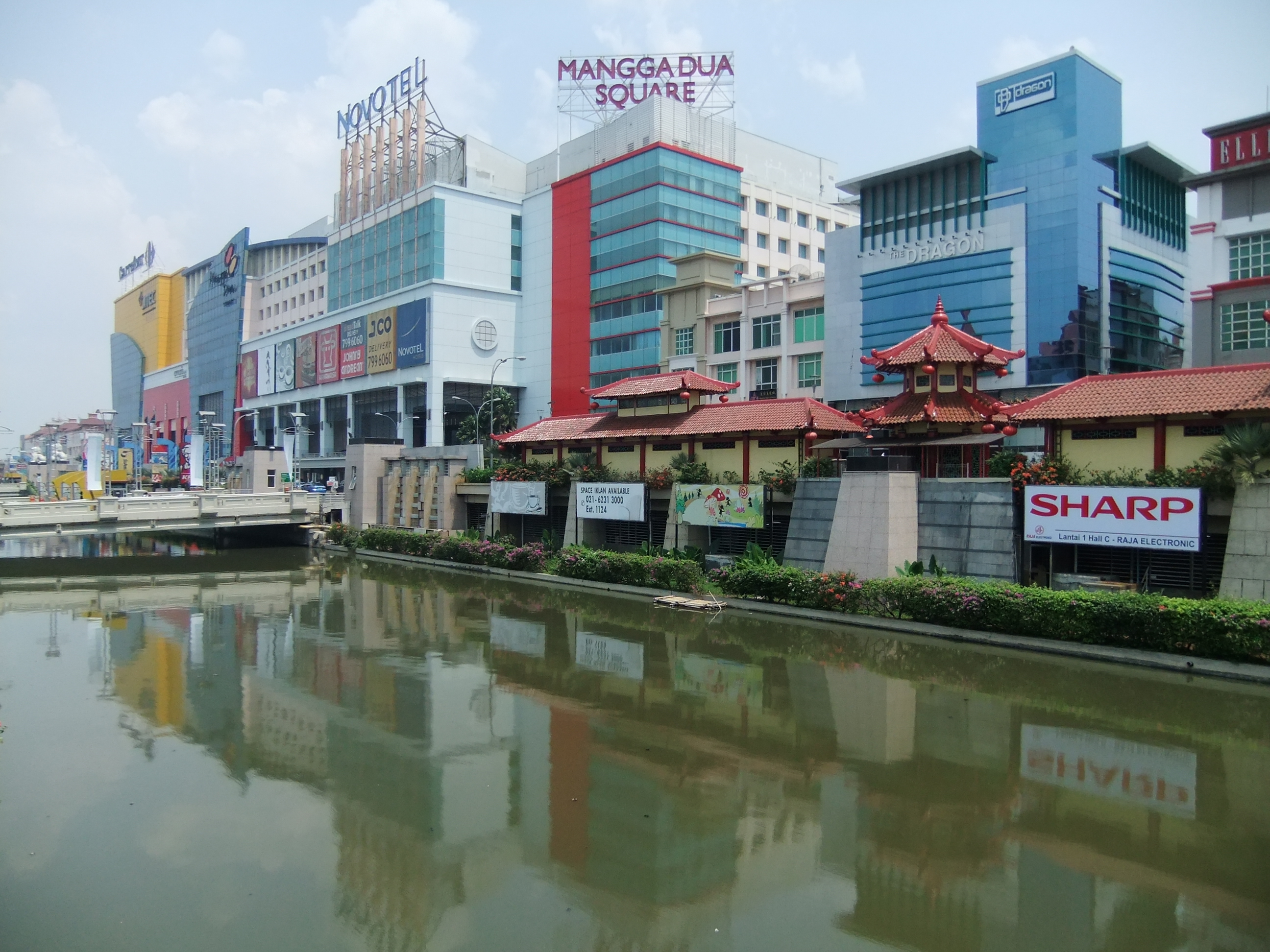
The eastern branch of Ci Liwung passing through a canal near Mangga Dua Square

The eastern branch flows along the canal of Jalan Antara, passing the Gedung Kesenian Jakarta and then along the canal of Jalan Gunung Sahari. The water ends up in Ancol.

Initially, a canal linked the eastern and the western branches of Ciliwung. Today this canal, which is now located on the south side of Jalan Tol Pelabuhan, was filled with slum settlement due to careless planning after the independence period.

After 1918 Jakarta's big flood, a new canal, the Banjir canal ("flood canal"), was constructed in 1922 to divert the water of several rivers of Jakarta, which includes Ciliwung, Cideng, and Krukut. The flow of the Ciliwung was diverted through the Manggarai floodgate, constructed at the point near Manggarai station. The water is diverted to the west of the city through Pasar Rumput, Dukuh Atas going northwest to Karet Kubur, and continues to Tanah Abang, Tomang, Grogol, Pademangan, and ends at Muara Angke.

The New East Flood Canal has been opened since 2010, a 23 kilometers canal from the Cipinang to the east and then to the north of Java Sea as a quarter of a circle with 100 to 300 meters width. On December 19, 2013, a contract to build water tunnel(s) to the East Flood Canal from the Ciliwung with a minimum capacity of 60 cubic meters per second was signed by the Public Works Ministry. So, the floods in East Jakarta to the north and along the Ciliwung River will be eased.

== History ==
=== Kingdoms of Tarumanegara and Sunda ===
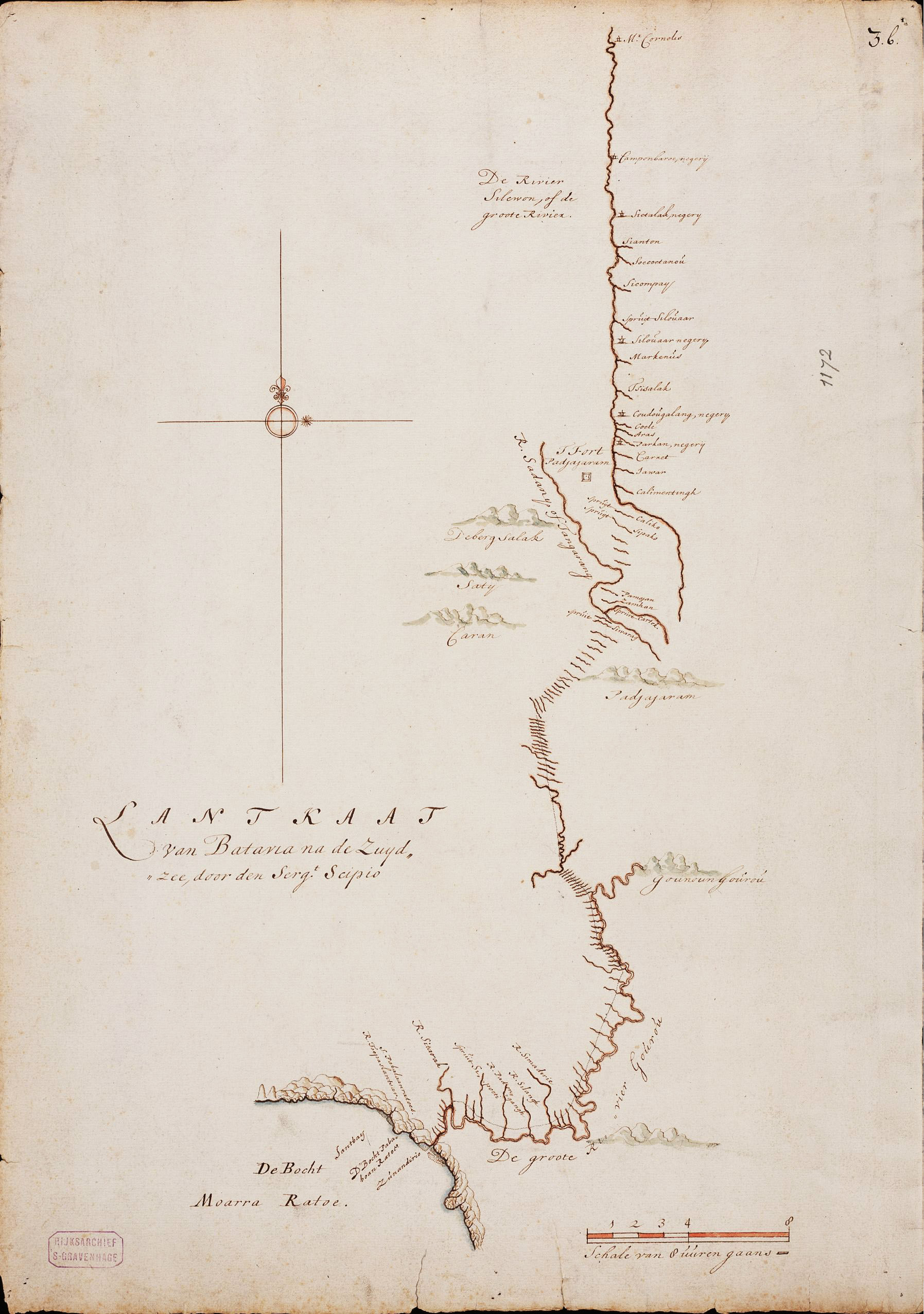
17th-century map of the area south of Batavia, showing the Ciliwung with outposts protecting the road from Batavia to Fort Padjajaran (now Bogor), the (River) Cisadane, and the Citarik.

The Ciliwung Basin has been populated at least since the 4th century. Two kingdoms were founded along the Upper Ciliwung in Bogor; Tarumanegara (4th-5th Century) with its King Purnawarman and Sunda (15th-16th Century) with its King Sri Baduga. The existence of these Kingdoms is found in ancient inscriptions at Ciaruteun (Tarumanagara) and Batutulis (Padjajaran).

In the early 16th century, the Ciliwung was an important means of transportation from the fortified city of Pakuan Pajajaran, the capital of the Hindu Sunda Kingdom. Sunda Kelapa, located at the mouth of the Ciliwung (more or less at the north end of present Kali Besar), was the main harbor of the Kingdom of Sunda. Among the many epithets of the king Sri Baduga Maharaja, was Prabu Haliwungan - so called because of his temperamental attitude. The Ci Haliwung or Ci Liwung was probably named after the king's epithet. The name Ci Haliwung or Tji Haliwoeng was recorded in the map of C.M. Pleyte (1919).

During the rise of the Hindu Kingdom of Sunda, the Ciliwung became an important means of transportation for the kingdom. To protect Sunda Kelapa from the Islamic Sultanate of Cirebon and Demak, Prabu Surawisesa (recorded by the Portuguese as Samian) was instructed by the king to sign a peace treaty with the Portuguese to trade in pepper in exchange for permission to build a fort to protect the main port of Sunda Kalapa. The pact was immortalized in a 1522 padrão. Despite the treaty, the Portuguese failed to construct the fort in the given year. The padrão of Sunda Kelapa was found by Fatahillah, commander of the Sultanate of Demak, and fell into the Ciliwung without any ceremony. The padrão will only be rediscovered in 1918.

=== VOC period ===
==== Within the walled Batavia ====
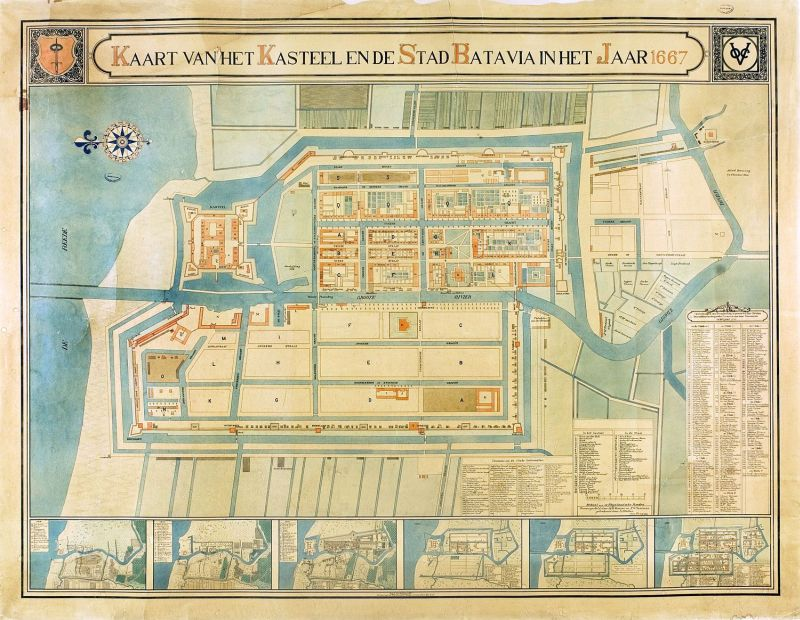
A map showing the transformation of the mouth of the Ciliwung into canals flowing through the inner city and moat flowing around the city and the fort of Batavia.

Sunda Kelapa was used as the main port by the Dutch (1619) who constructed a fort at the east bank of the estuary and founded Batavia, the largest city and the capital of the East Indies Empire until the city was transformed into Jakarta after the independence of Indonesia. Sultanate of Banten (1527)

With the establishment of Batavia in the 17th century, the Dutch diverted Ciliwung into canals following a typical Dutch city pattern. The waters of Ciliwung were also channeled to form two inner and outer moats and a wall surrounding the city of Batavia. The largest canal that flows through the middle of Batavia was named Kali Besar or Dutch Grote Rivier ("Big River"). Small boats sailed along Ciliwung to transport goods from warehouses close to Kali Besar to ships anchored at the port.

The maintenance of the canals within the walled city of Batavia is difficult because of its frequent sedimentation. In the middle of the 1630s, the canals became shallow, making it difficult for ships to enter Batavia. To deal with this, an 800 m-long (2,600 ft) ditch was constructed to the sea that was routinely dredged to ease the flow of water. The length of the ditch increased to 1,350 m (1827) from the mouth of the river due to the accumulation of sand and mud and what more with the earthquake in January 1699

A Ciliwung tributary that empties into the ocean was used for ship entrance into the castle from the canals to Waterpoort. The water of the canals was used by the citizens for drinking water. In 1689, the canals were still unpolluted and could be used for drinking water. The earthquake, which occurred in January 1699, caused an increase in sedimentation levels. Heaps of mud and sand accumulated in the ditch that was dredged to ease the flow of the water to and from the river.

In 1740, the canal of Batavia was considered unhealthy because of rubbish and the waste from the Binnen Hospital discharged into the river. Many patients suffered from dysentery and cholera. The unhygienic drinking water caused high death rates among the Batavia citizens. On the other hand, most of the Chinese who drank tea rarely got sick. Aware of this, many Dutch people ate tea leaves to stay healthy, but this attempt did not succeed. By the end of the 18th century, Doctor Thunberg still prescribed tea leaves instead of boiled water. It was still unknown at that time that bacteria could be killed by boiling water until boiling point. The Dutch still drank water from the Ciliwung through the 19th century. Water from the Ciliwung was initially stored in a reservoir (waterplaats or aquada) near Fort Jacatra, north of the city. Later the reservoir was transferred to the sides of Molenvliet in the Glodok area. The reservoir contains wooden water outlets which pour water from a height of about 10 feet. The local people know the area around this reservoir as Pancuran. Back then when Molenvliet was deep enough for boats to sail, the annual Peh Cun or Dragon Boat festival was held in the river.

==== In the area surrounding Batavia ====
Outside Batavia, within the ommelanden (the area surrounding Batavia), canals were constructed by channeling the waters of the rivers surrounding Batavia (e.g. the Ciliwung, River Ancol, River Angke, River Krukut, and River Grogol). The creation of canals is mainly to improve the transportation of goods to the walled city of Batavia and to expand agricultural land by draining the water of the marshes surrounding Batavia to be converted into arable land.

In 1648, the Ciliwung was connected with the Krukut via Molenvliet. There was an attempt to close the Ciliwung River course north of Noordwijk. The part of the river was dammed so that the river was forced to flow westward via Molenvliet. Despite the attempt, seasonal flooding occurred where the Ciliwung forced its water to flow back to its old tributary, which was still happening around 1725.

In 1681, the Ciliwung flow was diverted toward the east along the Postweg (now Jalan Pos) to reach a new canal known as the Gunung Sahari Canal. Gunung Sahari Canal diverted the flow of the Ciliwung to reach the Java Sea to the north, near the mouth of River Ancol (now the canal near Dunia Fantasi). In the Gunung Sahari Canal, the Ciliwung merged again with its old course at the Krekot Sentiong area. The construction of the Gunung Sahari Canal caused frequent flooding in the area along the Noordwijk (now Jalan Ir. H. Juanda). Because of this, a lock was constructed at the west side of the Noordwijk (named schutsluis Noordwijk, later becoming the Willemsluis) to protect Noordwijk from flooding, The lock gives name to the streets surrounding the area Jalan Pintu Air ("water lock street").

The part of the Ciliwung that flows straight from Harmoni to the north used to be a private river with toll payments for those who wanted to pass through it. This river was named Molenvliet and it was built by the Dutch by Kapitein der Chinezen (head of the Chinese in Betawi), Phoa Beng Gan known as Beng Gan. In 1648, Beng Gan received permission from the company to build this river and collected toll payments from sampans that passed through. In 1654, it was taken over by the company for 1.000 real.

== Restoration ==
The river water is murky once it reaches Jakarta because the area of its flow is a disposal area. As a result, the river is growing shallower and the flow slower. In 2014, the Audit Board of Indonesia released a four-year audit of the river and found that seventeen separate companies had been polluting its waters, submitting a report to the police.

Indonesian Ministry of Public Works and Public Housing (PUPR) has a separate Ciliwung Cisadane River Region Center (BBWSCC). DKI Jakarta Provincial Government and BBWSCC have an agreement on the normalization of some rivers in Jakarta. The DKI Provincial Government is tasked with freeing land for normalization needs to be carried out by BBWSCC. A restoration project is undertaken to widen and water flow of the river. The restoration project is divided into four sections with a total length of about 19 km, extending from Manggarai to the Jl. TB Simatupang area in South Jakarta. The Ciliwung will also be widened from the present 25 meters up to 40 – 50 meters. It is expected that the water flow will increase from the current 200 cubic meters per second to 570 cubic meters per second.

=== The Ciliwung-Cisadane tunnel ===
A coordination meeting on January 20, 2014, among the Ministry of Public Works, Ministry of Environment, Jakarta Governor, Bogor Mayor, Bogor Regent, and Ciliwung-Cisadane Rivers Control Office agreed to build Ciliwung to Cisadane River to ease Ciliwung debit when Cisadane is not in flood condition. The tunnel is 2.9 kilometers long and diameter of six meters.

== Culture ==
The Ciliwung flows through two provinces, West Java and the Special Region of Jakarta. Two main ethnic groups dominate the region, namely the Sundanese (West Java) in southern Ciliwung and Orang Betawi (Jakarta) in northern Ciliwung.

Culture in the Bogor area is mainly Sundanese, such as can be observed in traditional dances, the Ketuk Tilu, or the Jaipongan which is modern, sensual, and full of spirit. Specific Sundanese music can be observed from the Degung, Calung, Angklung, and Kecapi suling.

The culture of Jakarta can be seen in the Yapong dance and Gambang kromong, as well as Kroncong music, which can still be found at Tugu, north of Jakarta. Also famous is a humorous play, the Lenong, using a special Betawi dialect.

== Environment ==
The section of the Ciliwung in Jakarta is heavily polluted. Informal settlements or slums flourished on the banks of the Ciliwung, increasing the amount of waste and reducing the surface area of the river. Some canals were completely blocked by slums and people created informal gardens inside by drying the canal. Water maintenance and ecological awareness are minimal. Other sources of pollution originate from agricultural runoff of upstream river users and industrial pollution. Flooding is a problem in the Ciliwung. With many of the original forests converted into settlements around the Puncak area, the flooding has worsened each year.

In 2012, the government of Indonesia announced a 20-year plan to clean up the Ciliwung, which kicked off with a $10 million restoration project that will include the construction of a waste processing facility in 2013 and an education centre for riverside communities. The city administration now hires over 4000 workers to regularly clean the city's rivers, canals, lakes, and coastal areas. Ex-Governor Basuki Tjahaja Purnama also plans to turn parts of the Ciliwung riverbank into a tourist site.

== See also ==
- Kali Bekasi
- List of drainage basins of Indonesia

== Sources ==
- de Haan, Frederik (1935). Oud Batavia [Old Batavia] (in Dutch). Vol. 1. A.C. Nix. Archived from the original on 2020-08-05.
- Mulyawan Karim, ed. (2009). EKSPEDISI CILIWUNG, Laporan Jurnalistik Kompas, Mata Air - Air Mata. Jakarta: PT. Kompas Media Nusantara. ISBN 978-9797094256.
