= Pura Parahyangan Agung Jagatkarta =

Hindu temple in Java, Indonesia

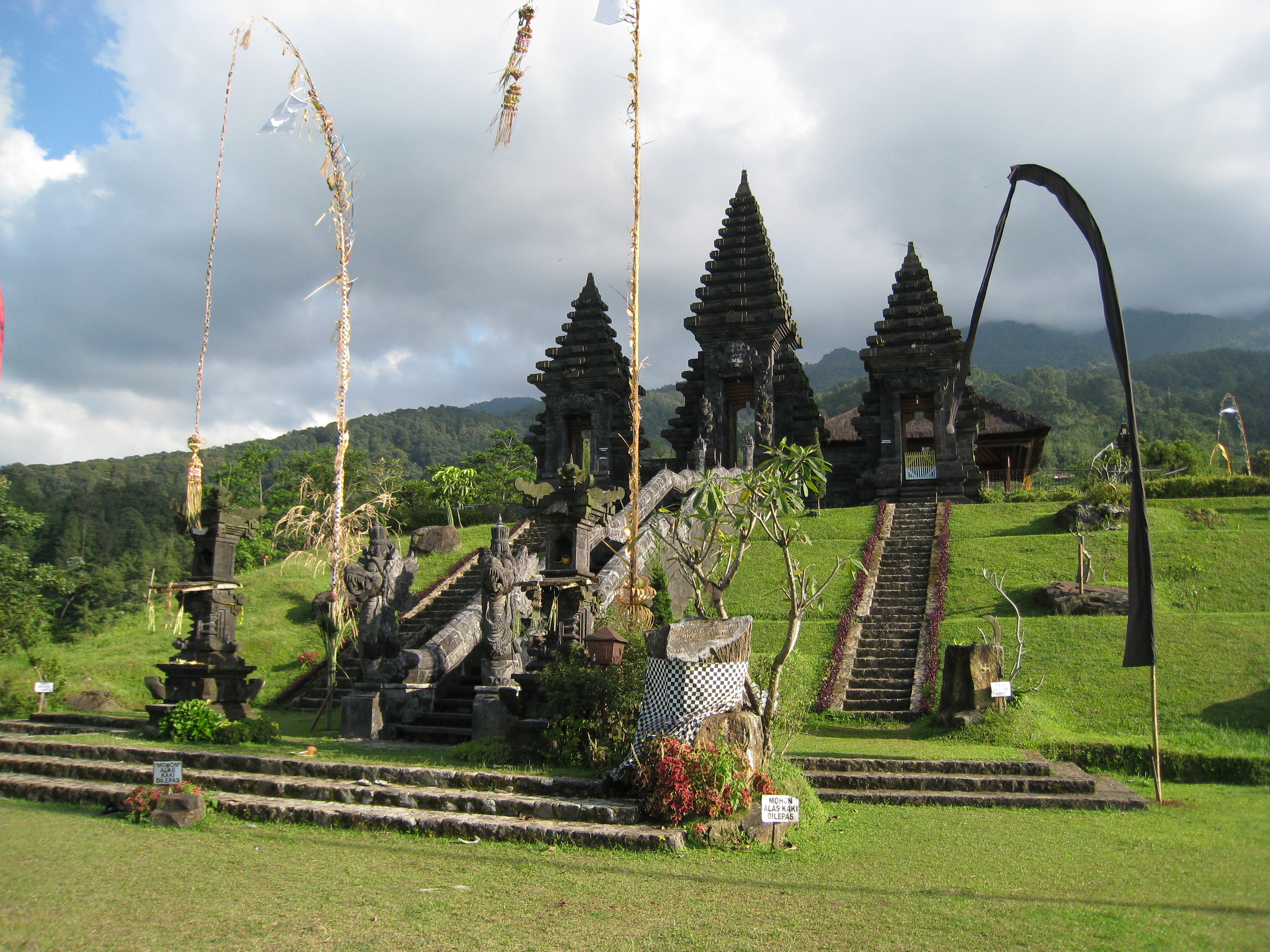
- Nāga stairs leading to Paduraksa portals of Pura Parahyangan Agung Jagatkarta, West Java.

- Location within Java

General information
- Type: Pura
- Architectural style: Sundanese and Balinese
- Location: Ciapus village, Tamansari subdistrict, Bogor Regency, West Java, Indonesia, Indonesia
- Coordinates: 6°40′10″S 106°44′07″E
- Elevation: 780 m (2,560 ft)

Pura Parahyangan Agung Jagatkarta ("the perfect divine nature") often referred to simply as Pura Parahyangan is a Hindu temple of Nusantara located in Ciapus village, Tamansari subdistrict, Bogor Regency, West Java, Indonesia.

The temple complex is a sacred place of worship, serving as a Pura Kahyangan Jagad, a type of pura located in a mountainous region, for Hindu Dharma devotees in the Greater Jakarta area. It is also considered a sacred place to honor the hyang (deified ancestral spirits) identified as King Siliwangi of Pakuan Pajajaran kingdom, an ancient Hindu kingdom that once stood in the Parahyangan area.

== Layout ==
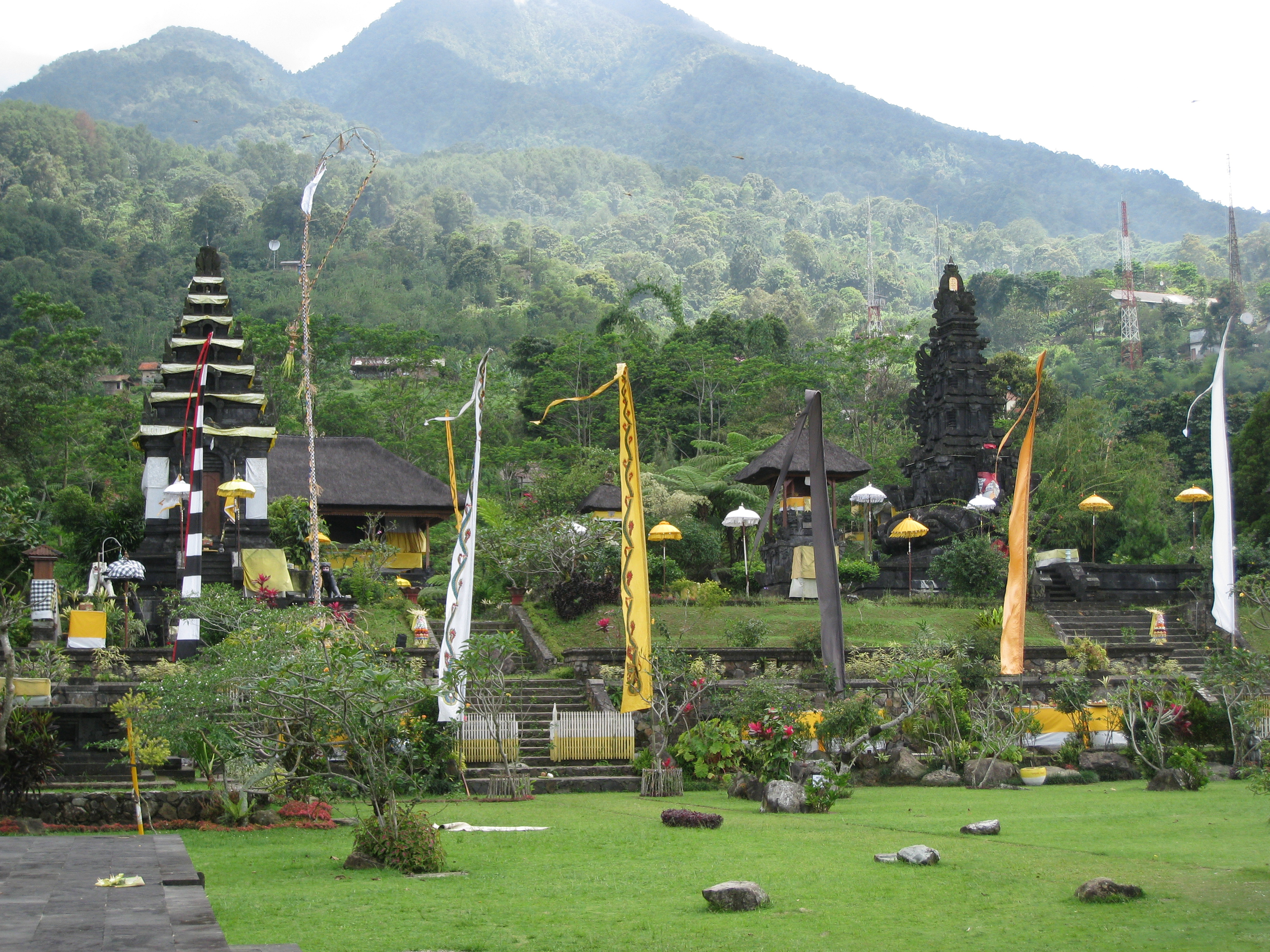
The Mandala Utama of Pura Parahyangan Agung Jagatkarta. On the left is a candi shrine dedicated to King Siliwangi, on the back is the sacred Bale Pasamuan Agung, and at the right is Padmasana Tower's main shrine. Mount Salak volcano in the background.

Pura Jagatkarta is located on the northern slope of Mount Salak, in Ciapus, Tamansari Subdistrict in Bogor Regency. The temple is built on a sacred location in Mount Salak where it is believed the Sunda Kingdom's Pakuan Pajajaran once stood. Historically, Pakuan Pajajaran (now Bogor) is the capital of the Sunda Kingdom, which was one of the last Hindu kingdoms in Java and experienced its golden age under the rule of King Siliwangi, before being conquered by Muslims in the 16th century.

The location of Pura Jagatkarta was also selected based on the legend that the area is the place where Prabu Siliwangi reached moksa with his soldiers. Before the temple compound was built, a candi temple with a black and white tiger statue (believed to be the symbol of Prabu Siliwangi) was constructed as a tribute to the Pajajaran Kingdom, the last Hindu kingdom in the land of Parahyangan.

The access road from the foot of Mount Salak to Pura Jagatkarta has been widened since its construction started in 1995, so vehicles can reach the temple easily. However, due to an increasing large influx of visitors, parking is located far from the temple area.

== Development ==
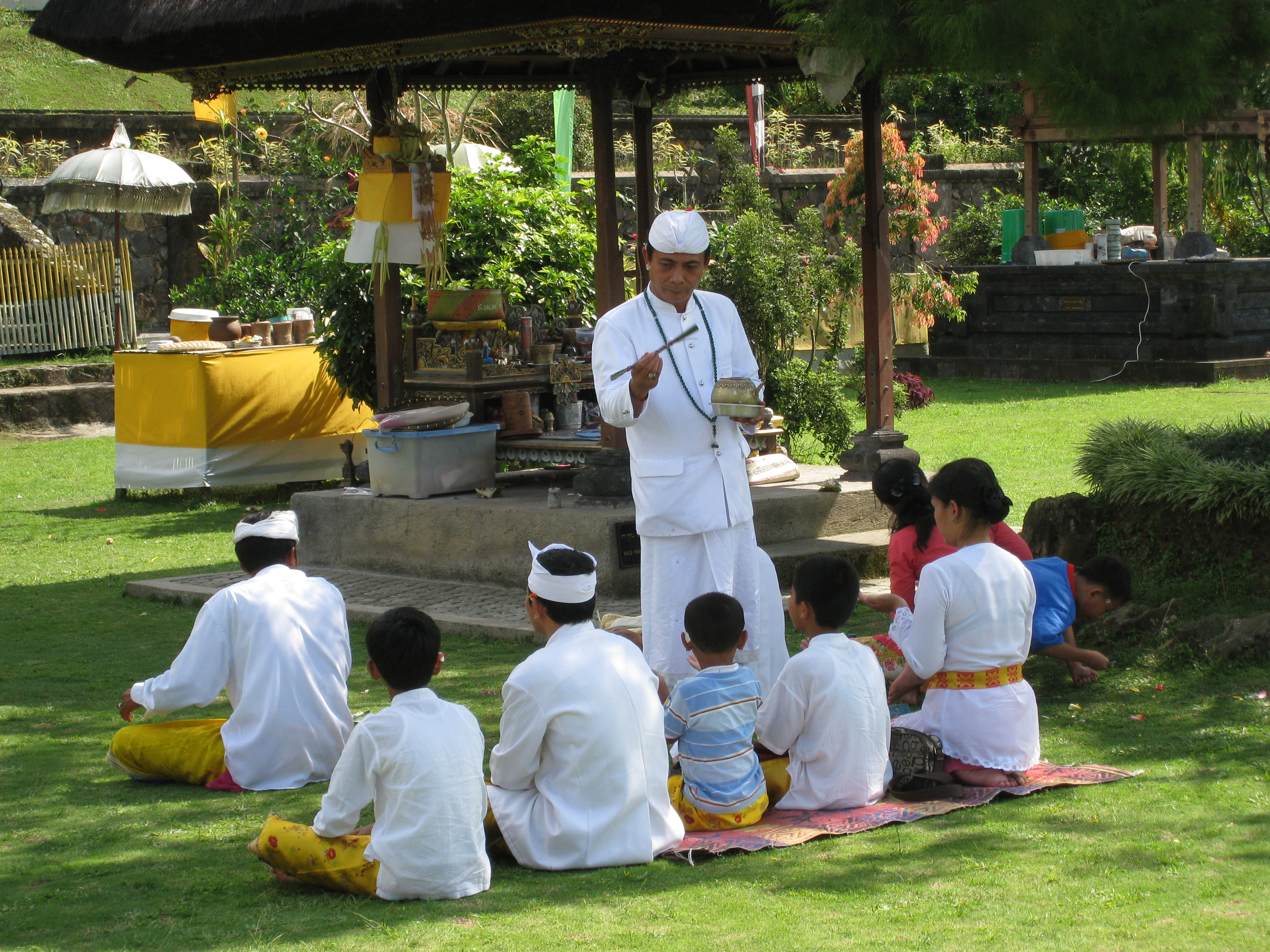
Hindu devotees performing prayer in the temple

The construction of Pura Jagatkarta started in 1995 and was initiated by a mutual cooperation of the Hindu Nusantara community to provide a Pura Kahyangan Jagad temple for the Balinese Hindu community resident in the Greater Jakarta area. This is to enable them to complete whole rituals required in the Hindu Dharma religion. At present, the temple compound has not been completed. However, the main temple buildings in the Mandala Utama, such as the Padmasana, Balai Pasamuan Agung, and Paduraksa Gates have been completed.

Before entering the main area of Pura Jagatkarta there is also the Pura Melanting and Pura Pasar Agung which is used specially for praying, perfecting, and sanctifying the offerings to be presented at Pura Jagatkarta as a form of gratitude. Tourists are generally prohibited from entering the main temple, except for those who want to perform ritual praying, for access is only otherwise available to the outer court temple.

== See also ==
- Balinese temple
- Hinduism in Indonesia
