= Siliwangi =

Siliwangi may refer to various people and institutions in the past and present of West Java, Indonesia:

- Prabu Siliwangi, eponymous ruler dynasty of Pajajaran Kingdom, a fifteenth century kingdom in West Java, centered in modern Bogor
- Siliwangi Division or KODAM VI/Siliwangi, a unit formed in West Java during the Indonesian National Revolution and named after the old kingdom
- Long March Siliwangi, the Siliwangi Division's fighting retreat from Central Java to West Java in 1949
- Kesatuan Komando Tentara Territorium III/Siliwangi (Kesko TT), early name of the Indonesian special forces unit Kopassus
- Raider Battalion Kodam Siliwangi, one of the Indonesian special forces Batalyon Raiders, formed in 2003
- Siliwangi Stadium, a multi-use stadium in Bandung
