= Mundinglaya Dikusumah =

Mundinglaya Dikusumah is a folklore among Sundanese people, Indonesia. The folklore tells about the life of a prince in the era of the Sunda kingdom when Great King Silihwangi (more famously known as Prabu Siliwangi) reigned in the kingdom. The Sunda Kingdom itself is often called by Sundanese as Pajajaran (the capital city of the kingdom) after Cirebon and Banten separated from it.

== Sources ==
This folklore originates from a Sundanese oral tradition called pantun story, which then transferred into books written by some Sundanese writers, both in Sundanese and Indonesian.

== Summary ==
King Silihwangi from Galuh married Nyimas Tejamantri. They had a son, Prince Guru Gantangan. When Prince Guru Gantangan was a teenager, the King married Nyimas Padmawati, a princess from Sunda Kingdom. King Silihwangi then became the king of Sunda Kingdom or Pajajaran. Prince Guru Gantangan was then assigned as a regent in Kutabarang. From Queen Nyimas Padmawati, King Silihwangi had a son called Prince Mundinglaya.

Because Prince Guru Gantangan didn't have any children except an adopted son called Prince Sunten Jaya, he asked Padmawati to look after Prince Mundinglaya. Prince Guru Gantangan also took care of Sunten Jaya. However, Prince Gurugantangan loved his half brother more than his own son, a strange attitude which might have been caused by the difference in character of both princes.

Prince Mundinglaya was an elegant, good looking as sweet where his nephew was proud and spoiled. It came not as a surprise when Prince Guru Gantangan's wife took care of him carefully. As a consequence, Prince Sunten Jaya became jealous of Prince Mundinglaya. So was the case with Prince Guru Gantangan. Prince Guru Gantangan put Prince Mundinglaya in prison with a reason that Prince Mundinglaya liked teasing a girl at court.

This decision made the people and the nobility in Pajajaran took sides and the discord threatened the kingdom to lapse into a quarrel among brothers.

At this critical moment something strange happened. One night Queen Nyimas Padmawati, Prince Mundinglaya"s mother had a strange dream. She was in her sleep seven "guriangs", creatures who usually lived in high mountains. They brought with them an amulet, called Layang Salaka Domas. The Queen heard the one who was holding the amulet in his hand, saying to the others: "There will be peace in Pajajaran only if a knight dares to fetch it from Jabaning Langit".

As soon as she awoke the next morning, she told the king about it. The king was very interested in the dream and immediately asked all the people as well as the nobility, including Prince Guru Gantangan and Prince Sunten Jaya to gather in front of the palace yard, where he told them about the queen's dream. Afterwards he asked, "Is there a knight who is ready to go to Jabaning Langit to fetch the amulet?"

No one responded. Not even Prince Sunten Jaya raised his voice. He was afraid of facing Jonggrang Kalapitung, a dangerous, forbidding giant who watched over the road. After a moment of silence it was Lengser, the Prime Minister, who raised his voice: "Your Majesty," he said, "everybody has heard you speaking, but there is still one man who has not. He is in prison. You have not asked him. He is Prince Mundinglaya." Hearing this the king ordered Prince Mundinglaya to be brought into his presence. Lengser then asked permission of Prince Guru Gantangan to release Prince Mundinglaya.

When Prince Mundinglaya came into presence, the king spoke: "Mundinglaya, would you like to go to fetch the amulet, needed to prevent the country from falling into a catastrophe?" Since Layang Salaka Domas is important for the security of Pajajaran, I am willing to go, Father," said Prince Mundinglaya.

The king was satisfied with this answer, the people and the nobility were delivered. To prince Mundinglaya this task also meant freedom if he succeeded, while to Prince Sunten Jaya it meant a way of getting rid of his enemy, as he was sure that his uncle would be killed by Jonggrang Kalapitung.

"Grandfather," he said, "he is a prisoner, if you let him go, there would be a guarantee that he returns."

"What do you propose, Sunten Jaya?"

"If he does not return after one month, put his mother Padmawati into prison in his palace." The people and the nobility were startled on hearing this request. The king turned to Prince Mundinglaya: "What do you say about?"

I shall return in a month time and agree with Sunten Jaya's proposal."

Several weeks, Prince Mundinglaya was taught martial arts and how to use weaponry as a preparation to combat obstacles hindering his way to Jabaning Langit.

Then Prince Mundinglaya left. As he had never gone to Jabaning Langit, he did not know the way. Leaving it to the guidance of God, he walked through thick forest to find Jabaning Langit and meet guriangs.

In his way, he passed Muaraberes (or Tanjung Barat) Kingdom. There he met Dewi Kania or Dewi Kinawati, a Muaraberes' princess, and fell in love with her. Prince Mundinglaya promised to meet her again after he has finished his duty to have Layang Salaka Domas.

Prince Mundinglaya continued his way. Suddenly he was awakened by the presence of the Jonggrang Kalapitung who was standing in front of him.

"Why did you enter my domain? Do you present yourself to be my meal?"

"Just try me!" the Prince answered calmly. Jonggrang Kalapitung immediately fell upon him but the Prince evaded him.

Time after time the giant tried to attack Prince Mundinglaya, but again he fell to the ground till at last he was out of breath. With the creese in his hand the Prince threatened the enemy:

"Tell me where is Jabaning Langit?"

"In your body." Thinking that he was betrayed, Prince Mundinglaya pressed the creese deeper into the giant's neck. "Do not lie! Where is Jabaning Langit?"

"In your own heart." Then the Prince let the giant loose, saying: "I let you free, but do not trouble the people from Pajajaran any longer." At this the giant thanked and left the Pajajaran wood forever.

When he was gone, Prince Mundinglaya found out a place for meditation, prayed very long, asking God for advice. One day, he felt as if he were dreaming. He was lifted from his place and flown to a place which was shining brightly.

There he was received by seven "guriangs" (supernatural creatures), one of whom was holding Layang Salaka Domas.

They asked him why he dared to come there. "My purpose is to fetch the Layang Salaka Domas needed for my country as a remedy for a quarrel between brothers. A lot of people will suffer and die for nothing."

"We appreciate you, Prince Mundinglaya, but we cannot give you Layang Salaka Domas as it is not for men. What about another present which we can give to you? A princess for example or wealth, or making you the most holy man in the world?"

"I do not need all those, if the people of Pajajaran were engaged in war."

"In that case, you should take it from us by force." A fight followed. As the "guriangs" were too strong, Prince Mundinglaya fell down, dead. Immediately another magical creature, Nyi Pohaci appeared at the place where the "guriangs" were standing around Prince Mundinglaya's lifeless body. She made him alive again and soon he was ready to fight the guriangs.

"It is no longer necessary, since you have shown your real character," one of them said, "honest, unselfish. You have the right to keep the Layang Salaka Domas." And he handed it to him. Prince Mundinglaya was very glad and thanked them. He also thanked Nyi Pohaci for her help. Then he left for Pajajaran escorted by the seven "guriangs" who then called themselves as one group: Gumarang tunggal.

In Pajajaran, Prince Sunten Jaya teased Prince Mundinglaya's mother. To the king he said that Queen Nyimas Padmawati did not really dream, that she had lied to free her son from prison. Therefore, he urged his grandfather to condemn the unlucky queen to death.

Prince Sunten Jaya even tried to overpower Dewi Kinawati in Muara Beres by telling her that Prince Mundinglaya had already been devoured by Jonggrang Kalapitung. People shouldered arms and attacked the kingdom. At the critical moment Prince Mundinglaya and his guards arrived in Muaraberes. The crowd cheered. Prince Sunten Jaya and his followers were defeated.

After coming back to Pajajaran, King Silihwangi proclaimed Prince Mundinglaya as his successor with the title of king Mundinglaya Di Kusumah.

At the same time the new king married Dewi Kinawati and so she became queen. Since then Pajajaran become a peaceful and prosperous country.
