= Bujangga Manik =

Old Sudanese literature remnant

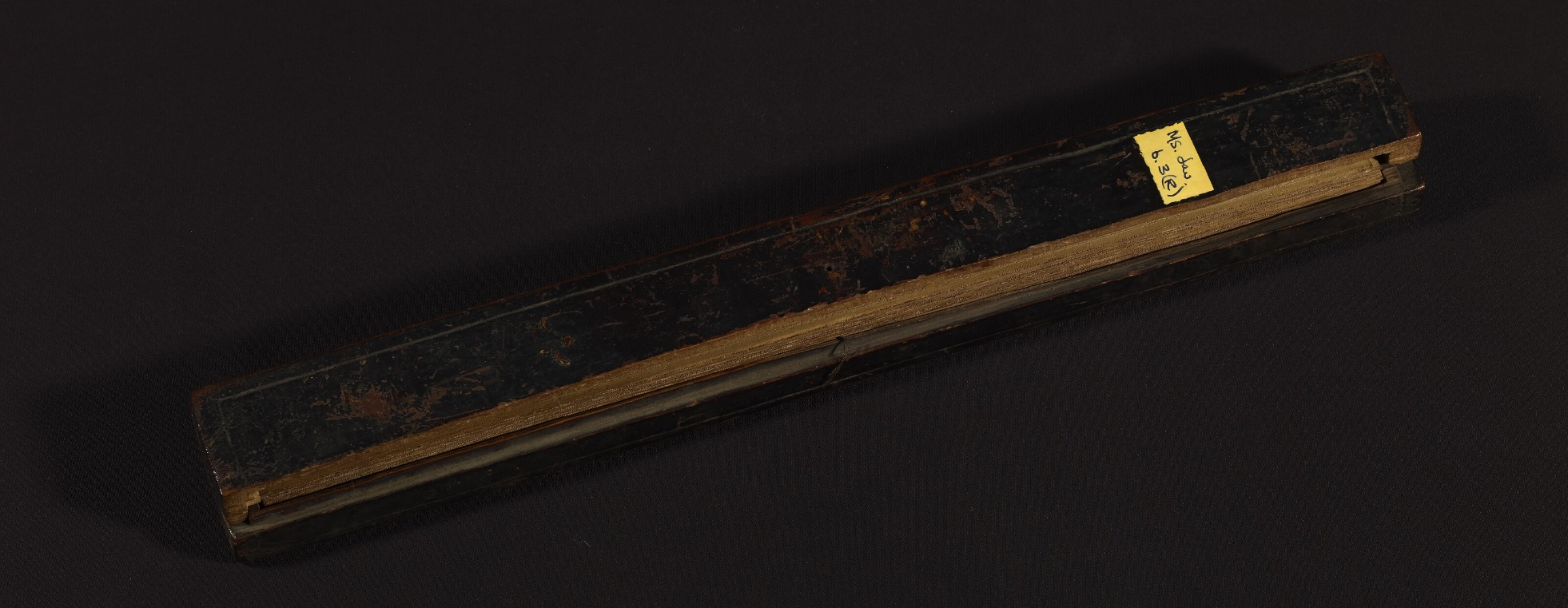

Bujangga Manik is one of the precious remnants of Old Sundanese literature. It is told in octosyllabic lines — the metrical form of Old Sundanese narrative poetry — in palm-leaf manuscript kept in the Bodleian Library of Oxford University in England, since 1627 or 1629 (MS Jav. b. 3 (R), cf. Noorduyn 1968:469, Ricklefs/Voorhoeve 1977: 181). Bujangga Manik altogether consists of 29 palm leaves, each containing approximately some 56 lines of 8 syllables. The final part of the text has been transmitted in a lacunary form. Not only is the end lacking, there are two other lacunae. The first break occurs after leaf 26, line 1476.

== Main character ==
The hero of the literature is Prabu (English: Prince) Jaya Pakuan alias Bujangga Manik, a Sundanese Hindu rishi, who, though a prince at the court of Pakuan Pajajaran (capital city of Sunda kingdom, which was located near present-day Bogor city in western part of Java island), preferred to live a life of spirituality. As a hermit he made two journeys from Pakuan Pajajaran to central and eastern Java and back, the second one including a visit to Bali. After his return he practiced asceticism on a mountain in western Java, where his bodily existence came to an end; in the final part of the text the journey of his soul to the heavenly regions is described in great detail.

A considerable part of the text is devoted to a detailed description of the first and the last stretch of the first journey, i.e. from Pakuan Pajajaran to Brebes and from Sunda Kalapa (now: Jakarta) to Pakuan Pajajaran (about 125 lines out of the total of 1641 lines of the incomplete MS), and to the whole of the second journey (about 550 lines). These descriptions are restricted mainly to a mention of the names of places, regions, rivers and mountains situated on or near the route followed. The total number of such names, including those in other parts of the text, comes to some 450, most of them relating to Java island.

== Background, location and period ==
The background of Bujangga Manik story had been based on contemporary reality, as is proven by the accuracy of the topographical details of the journeys. These details are therefore of great historical value, especially if the time of writing of this undated story can be at least roughly determined.

It is clear from the text itself that it dates from pre-Muslim times of West Java, precisely from the era of Hindu Sunda Kingdom. The script used in the manuscript is the usual Old Sundanese variety of the Indonesian family of Indic syllabaries, which fell into disuse after the penetration of Islam into western part of Java island. The language represents an older stage of Sundanese. It does not contain one word which is traceable to Arabic, the language of Islam. In the content of the story, too, Islam is completely absent. More specifically the mention of Majapahit, Malaka and Demak allow us to date the writing of the story in the 15th century, probably the later part of this century, or the early 16th century at the latest. During his return from Pemalang to Kalapa, he boarded the trading vessel from Malacca with crew hailed from various parts of the archipelago. This means the story took place prior to the fall of Malacca to Portuguese in 1511.

== Summary ==
After a brief introduction the protagonist, prince Jaya Pakuan, is introduced in line 14. This princely name is not mentioned later on; the name Bujangga Manik occurs for the first time in 456, and only from 854 on it is regularly used to indicate the protagonist. In lines 15–20 he takes leave from his mother, telling her that he is going east. He is quite succinct in explaining his departure. Of his costume we learn that he wears a haircloth (saceundung kaen 36); perhaps this haircloth is an indication of the religious state which Bujangga Manik assumes for his travel. He refuses to answer questions of the public about the purpose of his journey (38–41).

=== First journey ===
Then he starts his first trip, which he describes in great detail. Only a few details are mentioned here. One is that once he has climbed the Puncak Pass, he takes time, like a modern tourist, to sit down, ‘fan his body’ and enjoy the view, in particular the Great Mountain (Bukit Ageung, still known as the Gunung gede) which he calls ‘the highest point (hulu wano) of the realm of Pakuan’ (59–64).

From the Puncak Pass he travels on; by crossing the Cipamali river he enters the Javanese territory (alas Jawa 82) and wanders through various districts of Majapahit and the plain of the region of Demak; via Jatisari he arrives at Pamalang, still a well-known coastal town halfway between Tegal to the west and Pekalongan to the east. Here he is overcome by longing for his mother (89) and he decides to go home; however, this time he prefers to travel by sea and boards a ship from Malacca. The Sultanate of Malacca from the second half of the fifteenth century until its conquest by Portuguese in 1511 was the dominating trading power in the area. This was probably the time the story is set (was written).

The departure of the ship from the harbour is described as a festive ceremony (96–120): guns (wedil) are discharged, musical instruments are played, several songs, the titles of which are mentioned, are loudly sung by the crew; a detailed description of the materials used for the building of the ship is given: various kinds of bamboo and rattan, a mast of laka wood, and an Indian rudder are specifically mentioned; Bujangga Manik is duly impressed and full of admiration for the crew which originates from various places.

=== Homecoming ===
The trip from Pamalang to Kalapa, the harbour in West Java takes half a month (121), which suggest that the ship may have stopped at various places in between. The protagonist takes on a new name, Ameng Layaran “the sailing priar”, which also later on is used occasionally. From Kalapa Bujangga Manik comes first to the place of customs (Pabeyaan) and then proceeds to the royal court of Pakuan, in the northern part of the present-day town of Bogor (Noorduyn 1982:419). He enters Pakancilan (145), goes to the beautifully adorned pavilion and seats himself there. The first person narrative style is once interrupted in line 156 where the protagonist is called tohaan “lord”. He finds his mother engaged in weaving, various aspects of its technique being described in five formulaic lines (160–164). She is surprised and excited to see her son back. She immediately leaves her work and enters the house, passing through several layers of curtains, and ascends to her bedroom. This formulaic passage is repeated in identical form somewhat later (176–196 = 338–358).

The mother prepares the usual welcome for her son, which consists of a tray of all the ingredients for preparing betel quids, combs her hair, makes herself up and puts on expensive clothes. She then descends from her bedroom, leaves the house, seats herself under the palanquin and welcome her son. Again we have a formulaic description, as is apparent from parallel lines in the other texts. The stereotypic character is also clear from the fact that it is a passage deviating from the general narrative perspective which is focused on Bujangga Manik. It is a narrator's text, which ends with line 229. in 230 we return to the first person narrative: “My mother said”. The son accepts the betel quid which his mother offers him.

Then the text switches to a new passage, with a formula which is more commonly used in RR: “let us leave them chewing betel, we shall now talk about ….” (234–235). The story switches to Jompong Larang, the servant of Princess Ajung Larang Sakean Kilat Bancana. Jompong Larang leaves her palace, across the river Cipakancilan and comes to the palace. There she sees a stranger chewing betel in the guest-house. She recognize him as “a priar coming from the east”. Jompong Larang immediately becomes enamoured of his beauty, which is conventionally described in a passage of narrator's text (267–273).

The servant is in utter confusion and hastens back to the palace, kadatuan (277); there she goes to meet the princess (tohaan), who happens to be busy weaving; the formulaic description is partly identical with the earlier description (279–282 = 160–163). The princess, who is dressed in negligee and has an imported Chinese box placed besides her (284–290), sees from the corners of her eye the hurried return of Jompong Larang, who ascends the stairs and seats herself.

The lady asks her what her message is; the servant tells that she has seen an exceedingly handsome man, “a perfect match” for Lady Ajung Larang. At the latter's question she tells that his name is Ameng Layaran and that he is more handsome than Banyak Catra or Silih Wangi, or that “your Lady's nephew” (321), whoever that may be. The friar is the ideal lover, and moreover he is well versed in the scriptures and speak Javanese (327). Lady Ajung Larang is immediately overwhelmed with love and desire. She interrupts her weaving and enters her house. There she engages in preparing a gift for the young man, consisting of a variety of special betel quids, using exquisite materials and preparing them with the utmost care. The lady adds a collection of costly perfumes, “all of the perfumes from overseas”, as well as beautiful cloth and a kris.

Jompong Larang is sent to the prince with this expensive gift; her mistress explicitly requires her to explain that if the gift is accepted the lady herself will follow. The servant leaves the palace, loaden with all the presents: “a chest on her head, a betel-tray on her hands and the cloth on her arms” (411–413). Her route is described again (414–422), she arrives at the house where she finds Bujangga Manik's mother sitting on mattress. She asks Jompong Larang what her message is, and the servant duly reports the instruction given by the princess.

Then the mother addressed her son, in a lengthy speech explaining the outstanding quality of the gift (456–546). In fact she mentions many more articles that were early described. In particular the specification of the quids in 470–493 is remarkable: they are said to be prepared by forming, folding and rolling them on the thighs and the breast of the lady who prepared them, and by binding them with fringe threads of her frock, so “as to bind a young man, to excite a bachelor's desire” (470–478). It is clear that by this practice an extra sexual charge is loaded to the betel. A number of quids are identified by a specific name.

The mother urges her son to accept Lady Ajung Larang's offer; adding that if he agrees “there is no more than just that”; she mentions “symbolic gifts” (sesebutan 518–522) and ends her strong recommendation by describing the exceptional beauty of the princess and her eagerness to give herself to the young man; has she not said: “I shall give myself, I shall dive like a hawk, leap like a tiger, asking to be accepted as sweetheart”? (530–534; the mother is exaggerating, we have not heard these words from the lady herself).

But Ameng Layaran is shocked by his mother's enthusiasm which he calls “forbidden words” (carek larangan) and resolutely refuses to accept the gift in an equally lengthy declaration (548–650); he reveals the negative meaning of the sesebutan, which predict illness, tears and physical infirmity (563–574). His love is with the instructions which he received from his teacher (575–577). He requests her therefore to go together with Jompong Larang in order to return the gifts to the princess and to comfort her. He prefers to life in celibacy and to keep to the lessons which he received during his recent trip to Central Java, in the district of religious schools on the slopes of the Merbabu (here called gunung Damalung and Pamrihan), where, as one of the friars, he communicated with hermits and ascetics, following the teachers indicated as dewaguru, pandita, and purusa (593–606). What his mother requests from him is bad, she shows him the way to death and the cemetery, and ultimately to hell (608–624). He goes on to explain his background as a fatherless child, with a mother who went the wrong way, as a consequence of the fact that his grandmother did not uphold the taboos (pantang) when his mother was pregnant: she ate banana flowers and beunteur fish, as well as fish about to spawn, and she suffered from “squirrel convulsion” (625–640). “That is why it has come to this”. Therefore, he feels compelled for good to take leave from his mother (649–650).

=== Second journey ===
Bujangga Manik takes up his bag containing the great book (apus ageung) and the Siksaguru, as well as his rattan walking stick and his whip. He then declares that he is going east again, to the eastern tip of Java where he is going “to look for a place for my grave, to look for a sea to float away, a place for me to die, a place to lay down my body” (663–666). With these dramatic words he leaves the palace and begins his long wandering, never return home again.

He continues his journey eastward, mentioning a large number of place names and pointing out the high mountains in Central Java which he sees in the south, some of them bearing the names which are used until the present day.

== See also ==
- Sunda kingdom
- West Java
