= Pieter Scipio van Oostende =

Dutch explorer and soldier

Pieter Scipio van Oostende was a 17th-century Dutch explorer and soldier known for his expedition for the Dutch East India Company under the supervision of Governor-General Johannes Camphuys. He led a small army contingent into the inland Parahyangan region in present-day West Java, Indonesia in 1687. During his expedition, he discovered the ruins of Pakuan Pajajaran, the former capital of the Kingdom of Sunda and the Batutulis inscription in the present-day Bogor area, which later named by the Dutch as Buitenzorg. He was also the first European to reach the southern coastal area of Palabuhanratu, which was later known by the Dutch as Wijnkoopersbaai.
