= Pakuan Pajajaran =

Pakuan Pajajaran ᮕᮊᮥᮝᮔ᮪ᮕᮏᮏᮛᮔ᮪
- Historical city
- Nickname: Dayeuh Pakuan
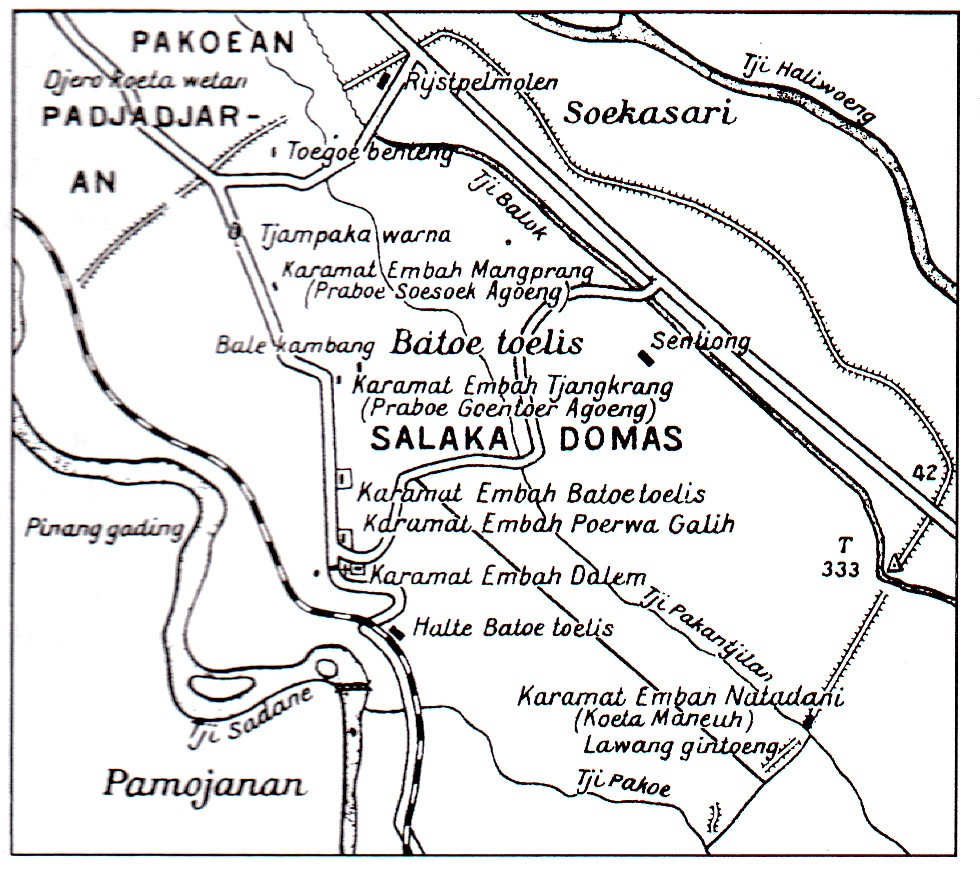
- Location of Pakuan Pajajaran copied from book "Kabudayaan Sunda Zaman Pajajaran" Part 2", 2005
- Country: Sunda Kingdom
- Founded: 669 AD
- Destroyed: 1579

Pakuan Pajajaran (Sundanese: ᮕᮊᮥᮝᮔ᮪ᮕᮏᮏᮛᮔ᮪; known as Dayeuh Pakuan/Pakwan or Pajajaran) was the fortified capital city of Sunda Kingdom. The location roughly corresponds to modern Bogor city in West Java, Indonesia, approximately around the site of Batu Tulis. The site is revered as the spiritual home of Sundanese people as it contains much of the shared identity and history of Sundanese people.

The city was settled in at least the 10th century but did not gain major political importance until Sri Baduga Maharaja established it as the royal capital of the Sunda kingdom in the 15th century. In 1513, the city was visited by its first European visitor, Tomé Pires, the Portuguese envoy. According to his report, the city of Daio (Dayeuh is a Sundanese term for "capital city") was a great city, with a population of around 50,000 inhabitants.

After the reign of King Jayadewata (Sri Baduga Maharaja), Pakuan Pajajaran served as the royal capital for several generations. Dayeuh Pakuan Pajajaran served as the capital of the Sunda Kingdom for almost a hundred years (1482–1579), until it was razed and destroyed by the Sultanate of Banten in 1579.

== Etymology and toponymy ==
In the Sundanese language, the word Pakuan is derived from the term paku which means "nail", and it also could mean "fern" plant. According to Carita Waruga Guru manuscript (c. 1750), the name was derived from pakujajar or rows of pakis haji or cycas plant. In Sundanese pakis haji means "king's fern" to refer to the cycas plant. This theory was further supported by K.F. Holle in his book De Batoe Toelis te Buitenzorg (1869), who mentioned that in the Buitenzorg area, there is a village called "Cipaku", and Pakuan Pajajaran refers to op rijen staande pakoe bomen (the place where rows of paku trees stood).

On the other hand, G.P. Rouffaer in his book Encyclopedie van Niederlandsch Indie editie Stibbe (1919) argued that the term "Pakuan" should be derived from the word paku which means "nail". The nail represents the king as spijker der wereld (the nail of the world). This is in line with the ancient Sundanese tradition that regarded their king as the nail or center of their realm. The tradition of analogically referring to the king as "nail" is also found in the Javanese Surakarta Sunanate tradition that refers to their king as Pakubuwono ("nail of the world"). Rouffaer further suggested that the term "Pajajaran" derived from the term sejajar (equal), thus Pakuan Pajajaran means "the king ('nail') of Sunda that was equal to any kings of Java".

R. Ng. Poerbatjaraka in his writings De Batoe-Toelis bij Buitenzorg (1921) explained that the term Pakuan derived from the Old Javanese word pakwwan, which refers to "camp" or "palace". Thus he suggested that the name Pakuan Pajajaran means aanrijen staande hoven (parallel courts/palaces), suggesting that the buildings and pavilions within the palace compound were arranged in parallel rows.

H. Ten Dam in his work Verkenningen Rondom Padjadjaran (1957), argued that the term Pakuan has something to do with the stone phallic symbol of lingam. This erected stone monument, which in Indic beliefs symbolized Shiva, is believed once stood near the Batutulis inscription as the symbol of the king's power and authority. This is also in line with the Menhir stone monument – supposedly megalithic culture still prevailed in ancient Sundanese society. Ten Dam also refers to Carita Parahyangan which mentions names of Sundanese kings; Sang Haluwesi and Sang Susuktunggal which are other names for paku (nail, pole, club, or lingam). Ten Dam further argued that Pakuan was not a name, but it referred to hoffstad (capital city). Referring to the report of Kapiten Wikler (1690), Ten Dam suggested that the term Pajajaran describes the geographic position of the capital. Pajajaran is derived from the stem word jajar, which means "parallel". This might refer to its location between two parallel rivers; Cisadane and Ciliwung. For a few kilometres in Bogor vicinity, both rivers run parallel, and this is believed as the location of Pakuan Pajajaran.

== Historiography ==
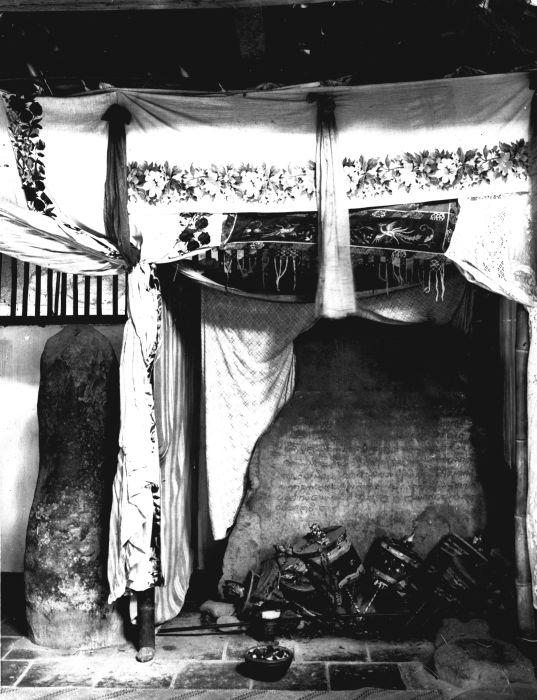
Batutulis inscription in Bogor stood in the remnant of Pakuan Pajajaran.

Pakuan Pajajaran was mentioned in several historical sources and archeological findings, mainly in the form of inscriptions and old manuscripts; among others are the Batutulis inscription (16th century), Kabantenan copperplate inscription, Bujangga Manik (15th century), Carita Parahyangan (1580), and Carita Waruga Guru (18th century) manuscripts.

Other than native sources, the account of Pakuan Pajajaran was also mentioned in European sources. The capital of Daio of Sunda kingdom was visited by a Portuguese envoy Tomé Pires in the early 16th century and was reported in his book "Summa Oriental" (1513–1515).

The Javanese Babad (historic chronicles) dated from the Mataram Sultanate period circa the 17th century, still referred to the area and the kingdom of West Java as "Pajajaran". The memory of the Pakuan Pajajaran has been kept alive among native Sundanese people through Sundanese Pantun oral tradition, the chant of poetic verses about the Golden Age of Sunda Pajajaran, and the legend of its illustrious King Siliwangi (Prabu Siliwangi), the most popular king in Sundanese tradition.

== History ==
=== Early history ===
The area near modern Bogor, in the river valleys of Cisadane and Ciliwung, has hosted settlements as early as the 5th century AD. The Ciaruteun area near the confluence of the Cianten and Ciaruteun rivers with Cisadane, around 19 kilometres to the northwest of Bogor, is an important ancient settlement. Within this area at least three stone inscriptions were discovered, one of them is the Ciaruteun inscription, linked to the illustrious king Purnawarman of Tarumanagara.

Pakuan Pajajaran is believed to have been established by King Tarusbawa in 669 AD. The Sanghyang Tapak inscription (Jayabupati or Cicatih inscription) dated from 952 saka (1030 AD), was discovered on the Cicatih River bank in Cibadak, Sukabumi, South of Bogor. The inscription mentioned about king of Sunda Maharaja Sri Jayabupati Jayamanahen Wisnumurti who established a sacred forest in Cibadak. This suggested that the area in and around modern Bogor had been settled and hosted a royal court of Sunda. In this city, King Susuktunggal (1382–1482) established a palace called "Sri Bimapunta Narayana Madura Suradipati" circa the early 14th century.

=== Reign of Sri Baduga Maharaja ===
By the late 15th century, King Sri Baduga Maharaja (reigned 1482 to 1521) — popularly known in Sundanese oral tradition as King Siliwangi, became the monarch of the unified kingdom of Sunda and Galuh. He transferred the capital city from Kawali in Galuh to Pakuan Pajajaran. One of the Sundanese Pantun legends tells vividly about a beautiful royal procession for Queen Ambetkasih and her courtiers moving to the new capital of Pakuan Pajajaran, where her husband awaits.

The Batutulis inscriptions mentions that the King had embarked on several public projects which erected a wall and digging a defensive moat around his capital in Pakuan, built Gugunungan religious sacred mounds, built Balay or pavilions, and also created the Samida forest as a conservation forest. He also built a dam and created a lake called Sanghyang Talaga Rena Mahawijaya. The lake probably functioned as a hydraulic project for rice agricultural purposes, and also a recreational lake to beautify his capital city.

The tradition as mentioned in Carita Parahyangan hailed that King Sri Baduga ruled justly from his Kadatwan (palace) called Sri Bima Punta Narayana Madura Suradipati at Pakuan Pajajaran, and his reign is celebrated as the golden age for Sundanese people.

The Bujangga Manik manuscript, composed circa the early 16th century, describes the travelogue of Prince Jaya Pakuan, also known as Bujangga Manik, a Sundanese Hindu hermit, who was also a prince at the court of Pakuan Pajajaran. He travelled extensively across Java and Bali. The Pakuan Pajajaran city was his home, where his mother resides. He describes his journey; from Kalapa Bujangga Manik comes first to the place of customs (Pabeyaan) and then proceeds to the royal court of Pakuan, in the present-day town of Bogor (Noorduyn 1982:419). He enters through the direction of the Pakancilan River (145), goes to the beautifully adorned pavilion, and seats himself there. Here the prince is called tohaan or "lord". He finds his mother engaged in weaving (160–164). She is surprised and excited to see her son back home. She immediately leaves her work, and enters the house, passing through several layers of curtains, and ascends to her bedroom. The mother prepares the usual welcome for her son, which consists of a tray of all the ingredients for preparing betel quids, combs her hair, makes herself up, and puts on expensive clothes. She then descends from her bedroom, leaves the house, seats herself under the palanquin, and welcomes her son.

The manuscript also describes the courting customs of ancient Sundanese society, where it was acceptable for a woman to court a man she desired. Bujangga Manik found himself being courted by Lady Ajung Larang, a princess living across the Pakancilan River within the city wall, that being enamoured him. The Lady sent her servant Jompong Larang to the Bujangga Manik's house bringing expensive gifts, and explained her intention to Manik's mother.

Bujangga Manik also describes the Great Mountain (Bukit Ageung, still known as the Gunung gede) which he calls "the highest point (hulu wano) of the realm of Pakuan" (59–64). During his travel, Bujangga Manik took a ride on a Malay Malaccan merchant ship. This suggests that the events in Bujangga Manik took place circa 1500, before the Portuguese conquest of Malacca in 1511.

The reign of Sri Baduga Maharaja also marked the earliest contact with Europeans. By 1511, the Portuguese had conquered Malacca and established the earliest European colony in Southeast Asia. According to Suma Oriental, written in 1512–1515, Tomé Pires, a Portuguese explorer reported about the Great city of Daio or Dayo, which corresponds to the Sundanese term Dayeuh (capital city).

"First the king of Çumda (Sunda) with his great city of Dayo, the town and lands and port of Bantam (Banten), the port of Pomdam (Pontang), the port of Cheguide (Cigede), the port of Tamgaram (Tangerang), the port of Calapa (Kelapa), and the port of Chemano (Chi Manuk or Cimanuk), this is Sunda, because the river of Chi Manuk is the limit of both kingdoms.
The city where the king resides in most of the year is the great city of Dayo... This city is two days' journey from the chief port, which is called Calapa. The city (Dayo) has well-built houses of palm leaf and wood. They say that the king's house has three hundreds and thirty wooden pilars as thick as wine cask, and five fathoms high and beautiful timberwork on the top of the pillars and very well-built house."

— Suma Oriental.

Tomé Pires described that the city of Pakuan Pajajaran was beautiful, filled with houses made of wood with thatched roofs made of palm leaves. The residence of Sunda King is large and well-kept, a well-built wooden structure with hundreds of wooden columns, adorned with beautiful timberwork and wood carvings.

=== Destruction ===
In the 1550s, Sultan Hasanuddin of Banten decided to launch the final blow to what remained of the kingdom of Sunda. He sent his son, Prince Maulana Yusuf to lead the attack on Dayeuh Pakuan. After losing its most important port Sunda Kelapa, the Sunda kingdom, already deprived of its trading revenues, was of symbolic importance only. However, the fortified city walls and moats of Pakuan Pajajaran remained a formidable defense for the weakened Hindu kingdom. King Nilakendra (reign 1551 to 1567), also known as Tohaan di Majaya, most of the time could not stay in the Dayeuh because of ongoing battles with Banten.

During the reign of Raja Mulya (reign 1567 to 1579), also known as Prabu Surya Kencana, the kingdom declined essentially, particularly after 1576. In Carita Parahyangan, he is known as Nusiya Mulya. Probably due to Banten's siege of Dayeuh Pakuan, he moved his court further westward to Pulasari, in today's Pandeglang Regency, in Kaduhejo, Menes Subdistrict, on the slope of Mount Pulasari. The location of Pulasari despite inland, was curiously much closer to the Banten capital.

In 1579, the gates of Pakuan Pajajaran were finally breached, due to the betrayal of an official guard. Thus the city was razed and destroyed by the Sultanate of Banten. The sacred stone called watu gigilang that was serving as the sovereign's throne of the Sunda kingdom was taken away from Pakuan and put at the street intersection in the royal square of Banten, thus marking the end of the Sundanese dynasty. Henceforth, this stone was to serve as the Banten sovereign's throne.

The kingdom put up little resistance and henceforth Banten ruled over the entire territory of the former kingdom of Sunda, which corresponds to most of the current province of West Java.

=== Rediscovery ===
By the 17th century, the city of Pakuan Pajajaran had been reclaimed by tropical rainforest and infested by tigers. The first Dutch expedition into inland West Java was led in 1687 by Pieter Scipio van Oostende. He led his team to explore deep south from Batavia into the remnant of Pakuan and ended in Wijnkoopsbaai (present-day Palabuhanratu). One of the members of his expedition team was mauled by a tiger in the area two days earlier. Scipio learned from Lieutenant Tanuwijaya's men from Sumedang that the ruins were the remnants of the Pakuan or Pajajaran kingdom. On 23 December 1687, Governor-General Joanes Camphuijs wrote a report to his superior in Amsterdam. The report reads: dat hetseve paleijs en specialijck de verheven zilplaets van den javaense Coning Padzia Dziarum nu nog geduizig door een groot getal tijgers bewaakt en bewaart wort which translates to "that the hilted palace and the special exalted silver tablets of the Javanese King of Pajajaran, guarded by a large number of tigers." The report on the tiger sightings also comes from the residents of Kedung Halang and Parung Angsana who accompanied Scipio on this expedition. Perhaps this was the source of the popular belief that the Pajajaran king, nobles, and guards were transformed into mythical tigers.

Three years later, Captain Adolf Winkler was ordered to lead an expedition to map the location of the former Pakuan Pajajaran capital. On Thursday, 25 June 1690, Winkler and his entourage arrived at the site of the former palace. He found what he reported as "een accrate steen vloering off weg" (a very neat floor or stone paved road). The road leads to the old paseban (pavilion) and there he sees a row of seven banyan trees. The Parung Angsana residents who accompanied Winkler explained that what they saw was the remnant of King Siliwangi's palace.

It seems by the late 17th century, or approximately 130 years after its fall, the city of Dayeuh Pakuan Pajajaran was depopulated and abandoned, thus subsequently reclaimed by rainforest and infested by tigers. By this time, no tangible structures of the former Pajajar palace or any habitation area remain. Most probably, the ancient capital was originally made from organic, wooden, and thatched materials, which would be completely decayed and destroyed just for a few generations due to torrential tropical rains and termite infestation. The tangible remains were the former stone floor and stone-paved road, as well as several banyan trees in the regular distance, that seem most likely to have been planted by humans rather than by natural seeding. The Batutulis inscription is one of the few in situ inscriptions, still left intact in the location, which is still revered by locals as a site for pilgrimage of spiritual purpose.

== See also ==
- Sunda Kingdom
- Sundanese people
- Bogor
- West Java
- Banten Sultanate
- Sunda Kelapa (now Jakarta)
- Universitas Padjadjaran
