= Prabu Siliwangi =

Legendary king of Hindu Sunda

Prabu Siliwangi (Sundanese: ᮕᮢᮘᮥ ᮞᮤᮜᮤᮝᮍᮤ) was a dynasty semi-legendary king of the Hindu Sunda Kingdom in pre-Islamic West Java.

He is a popular character in Pantun Sunda oral tradition, folklore, and tales that describe his reign as a glorious era for the Sundanese people. According to tradition, he brought his kingdom greatness and prosperity.

The character of King Siliwangi is semi-mythology since Sundanese oral tradition simply identifies the great king of Sunda as "King Siliwangi" regardless of the era or historical periods. It is difficult to identify the exact historical character represented in the legend of King Siliwangi. As a result, the tale of this king spanned and varied greatly from the mythical era of Sundanese gods to the coming of Islam in the land of Sunda and the fall of the kingdom.

Several historic Sundanese kings are suggested as the real characters inspired by the legend of King Siliwangi. The most popular interpretation links King Siliwangi with Sri Baduga Maharaja (said to have reigned 1482–1521). Another suggestion is that the legend of King Siliwangi might perhaps have been inspired by the history of Niskala Wastu Kancana instead (said to have reigned for 104 years 1371–1475).

== Etymology ==
A linguistical theory suggests that Siliwangi is derived from the Sundanese words of Silih Wangi, meaning a descendant of King Wangi.

According to Kidung Sunda and Carita Parahyangan, King Wangi is identified as King Lingga Buana, a king of Sunda who died at Majapahit in 1357 AD in the Battle of Bubat. Hayam Wuruk, the Majapahit king, intended to marry Dyah Pitaloka Citraresmi, a daughter of King Lingga Buana. The Sunda royal family came to Majapahit to marry the princess Hayam Wuruk. However, Gajah Mada, prime minister of the Majapahit Empire, saw this event as an opportunity to demand Sunda's submission to Majapahit. He demanded that the princess not be treated as the queen of Majapahit, but merely as a concubine, as a sign of Sunda's submission.

Angered by Gajah Mada's insult, the Sunda royal family fought the overwhelming Majapahit forces to the death to defend their honor. After his death, King Lingga Buana was named King Wangi (king with a pleasant fragrance) because of his heroic deed to defend his kingdom's honor.

His descendants with the same quality of greatness were called Silihwangi (successor of Wangi). After the reign of King Wangi (Prebu Maharaja), the Kingdom of Sunda saw seven consecutive successor kings, technically all of them are considered as the successor of Wangi (Silihwangi).

Some other historians believe that Siliwangi is derived from the Sundanese word Asilih Wewangi, meaning changing title.

== Legend of Prabu Siliwangi ==
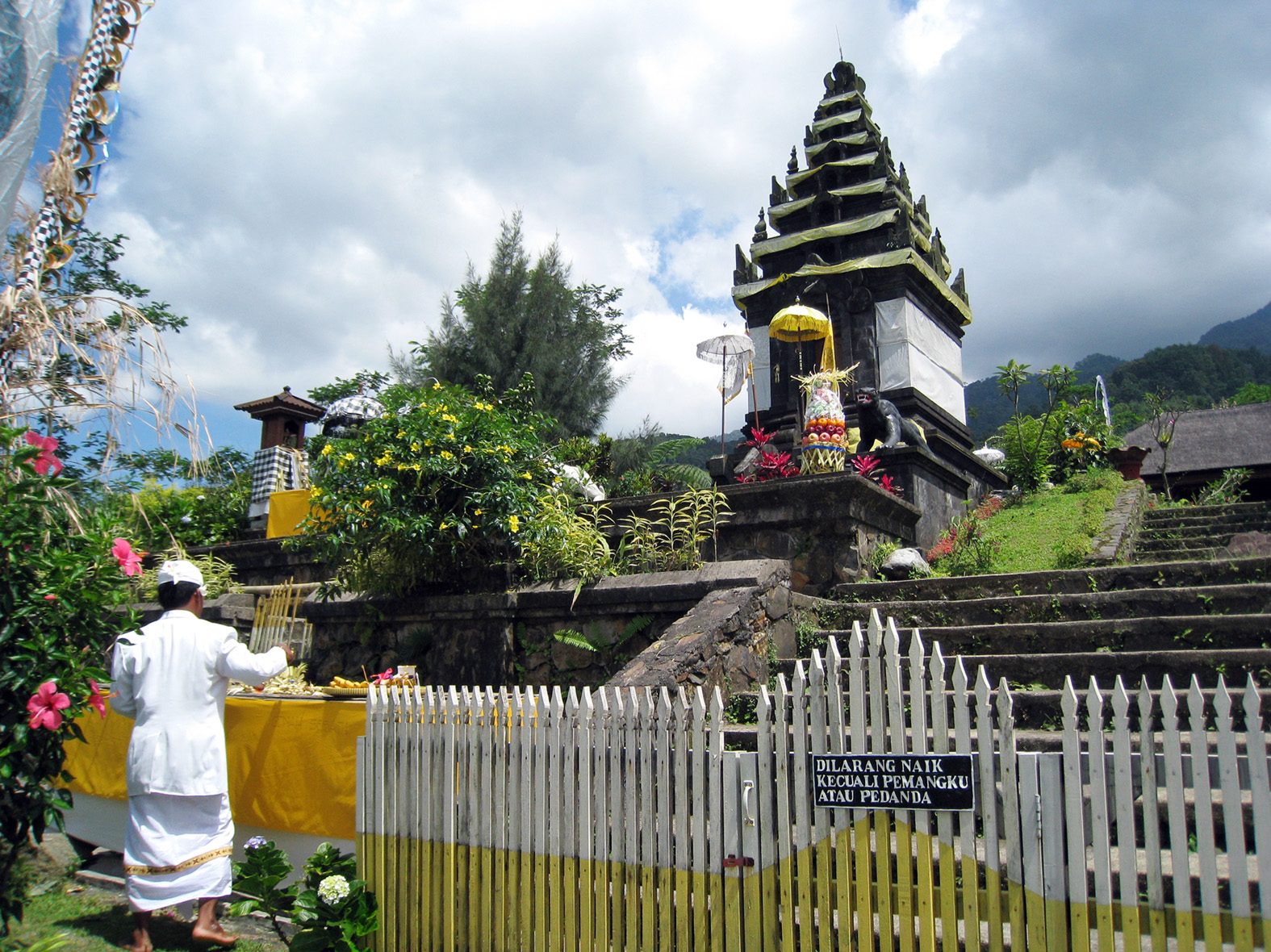
A shrine dedicated to King Siliwangi in the Hindu temple Pura Parahyangan Agung Jagatkarta, Bogor, West Java.

One of the stories tells about Prince Jayadewata, the son of Prabu Anggalarang, king of Galuh, who ruled from Surawisesa Palace in Kawali. Prince Jayadewata also known as Ratu Purana Prebu Guru Dewataprana.

During his youth, the prince was known as Raden Pamanah Rasa (the archer of feelings of love). The name suggests that he was a charming and strikingly handsome young man. People easily fell in love with him. The tradition says he was a master of literature, music, dance, and the arts, as well as Pencak silat martial arts and the princely arts of sword fighting and archery.

An usurper of evil ambition overthrows King Anggalarang and murders him, taking over the throne. The prince Jayadewata is poisoned, drugged, and cast under a black magic spell that causes him to suffer amnesia and insanity. The powerful but insane prince wandered around and caused trouble in many villages, until Ki Gedeng Sindangkasih, the chief of Sindangkasih village, managed to pacifize him. With the love of Nyi Ambetkasih, Ki Gedeng's daughter, the prince is finally cured of his illness. Prince Jayadewata married Nyi Ambetkasih. Later, Prince Jayadewata managed to gain the support of the people and succeeded in reclaiming his rightful throne.

== Animal associations ==
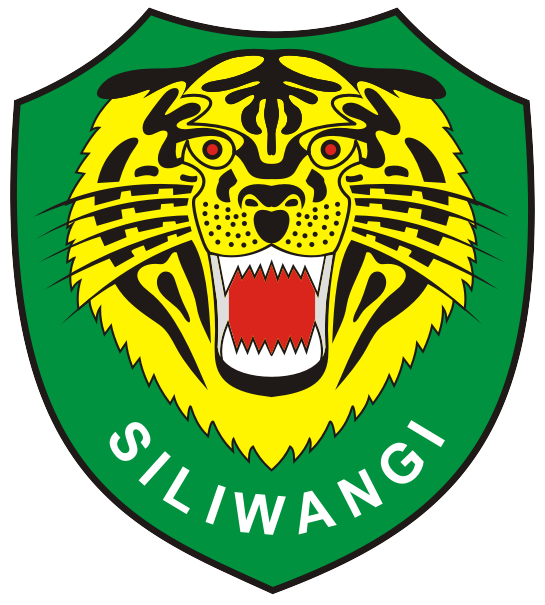
Tiger emblem of Siliwangi Division.

Traditions associated King Siliwangi with the mythical tiger and sometimes the black and white leopard, as his guard. According to legends after the Sultanates of Cirebon and Banten sacked the capital of Pakuan Pajajaran, the king refused to convert to Islam, yet he also refused to fight the invading Muslim forces, since the Sultan of Cirebon was his kin. Tradition tells that after the fall of Pakuan, the last king of Sunda, accompanied by his faithful followers, retreated to Mount Salak located south of the capital to avoid further bloodshed. Then the king is ngahyang (he disappeared) to become a hyang or spirit. He turned into a mythical beast, the sacred tiger. Tradition mentioned that the King disappeared in the Sancang forest, near the southern sea far south in Garut Regency.

By the 17th century, the city of Pakuan Pajajaran had been reclaimed by tropical rainforest, and infested by tiger. The first Dutch expedition into inland West Java was led in 1687 by Pieter Scipio van Oostende. He led his team to explore deep south from Batavia into the remnant of Pakuan and ended on Wijnkoopsbaai (present-day Palabuhanratu). One of the members of his expedition team was mauled by a tiger in the area, two days earlier. Scipio learned from Lieutenant Tanuwijaya's men from Sumedang that the ruins were the remnants of the Pakuan or Pajajaran kingdom.

On 23 December 1687, Governor-General Joanes Camphuijs wrote a report; "that the hilted palace and the special exalted silver tablets of the Javanese King of Pajajaran, guarded by a large number of tigers." The report on the tiger sightings also comes from the residents of Kedung Halang and Parung Angsana who accompanied Scipio on this expedition. Perhaps this was the source of the popular belief that the Pajajaran king, nobles, and guards were transformed into mythical tigers.

== Notable historical characters ==
The compiled legends of King Siliwangi do not always correspond with historical facts and records, since some events are vague and do not correspond to the lifetime of the historic Sri Baduga Maharaja. For example, the fall of Pajajaran occurs in later times, during the reign of later Sunda kings, the great-great-grandson of Sri Baduga. Some legends seem to simply identify the series of last Sunda kings as Siliwangi. However, these legends try to explain the historical events of the Sunda kingdom and its relationship with the Sultanates of Cirebon and Banten.

=== Niskala Wastu Kancana ===
The legend of King Siliwangi has been around and is popularly known in the Sundanese oral tradition of Carita Pantun as early as 1518 CE. It was the era of King Jayadewata's reign. Ayatrohaedi, a Sundanese historian argued that it took years for a historical character to gain a revered legendary status, featured in tales and folklores. Thus, it is highly unlikely for a living and ruling character, like Jayadewata, to be revered as such in circulating pantun poetic verses. He suggested that the real historical character should be the predecessor of Jayadewata, and pointed out that King Niskala Wastu Kancana was most likely the real historical character behind the legend of King Siliwangi.

By the earliest time the legend of King Siliwangi appeared, Niskala Wastu Kancana had been dead for about 40 years. So it is reasonable that the cult or veneration of this late king had appeared by this time. In the Sundanese ancient tradition of Hinduism mixed with native ancestral worship, a dead ancestor of great character is believed to have gained a god-like power in the afterlife, and even might be invoked to protect, lend help, and interfere with their descendant's affairs.

Niskala Wastu Kancana ruled for 104 years, between 1371 and 1475. His reign is remembered as a long era of peace and prosperity. It is possible that his long-lasting reign was fondly remembered by his people as a golden age, thus started a cult or veneration years after his death, and inspired the pantun poetic verses.

=== Ningrat Kancana ===
According to Purwaka Caruban Nagari, the chronicle of Cirebon, the Sunda King Siliwangi married Nyai Subang Larang, daughter of Ki Gedeng Tapa, port master of Muara Jati, which corresponds with the port of Cirebon. They had three children; Prince Walangsungsang born in 1423, Princess Rara Santang born in 1426, and Prince Kian Santang (Raden Sangara) born in 1428.

Although Prince Walangsungsang was the first-born son of the Sunda King, the prince did not earn the right as a crown prince of the Sunda Kingdom. This was because his mother, Nyai Subang Larang was not the prameswari (queen consort). Another reason was probably because of his conversion to Islam, probably influenced by his mother, Subang Larang who was a Muslim woman. In 16th century West Java, Sunda Wiwitan (Sundanese ancestral religion), and Buddhism. It was his half-brother, King Siliwangi's son from his third wife Nyai Cantring Manikmayang, who was chosen as crown prince.

Ningrat Kancana is also known as Prabu Dewa Niskala. The character described in Cirebon Chronicle Purwaka Caruban Nagari, as King Siliwangi, both timeline and storyline, matched the historic character of Dewa Niskala or Ningrat Kancana, referred to as "Tohaan di Galuh" (Lord of Galuh) in Carita Parahyangan. Tohaan di Galuh was the son and heir of Niskala Wastu Kancana. Ningrat Kancana however, reigned for only seven years and subsequently demoted. Carita Parahyangan says that "... kena salah twa(h) bogo(h) ka estri larangan ti kaluaran ..," which translates as "because (his) wrongdoing, fell in love with a forbidden outsider woman." The term "outsider woman" is interesting and has led to various propositions; could it be the new king who fell in love with a foreigner, outsider, non-Sundanese (possibly Javanese), or even non-Hindu (Muslim) woman? It is possible that the outsider forbidden woman mentioned here was Nyai Subang Larang, a Muslim woman daughter of the port master of Muara Jati (Cirebon).

=== Sri Baduga Maharaja ===
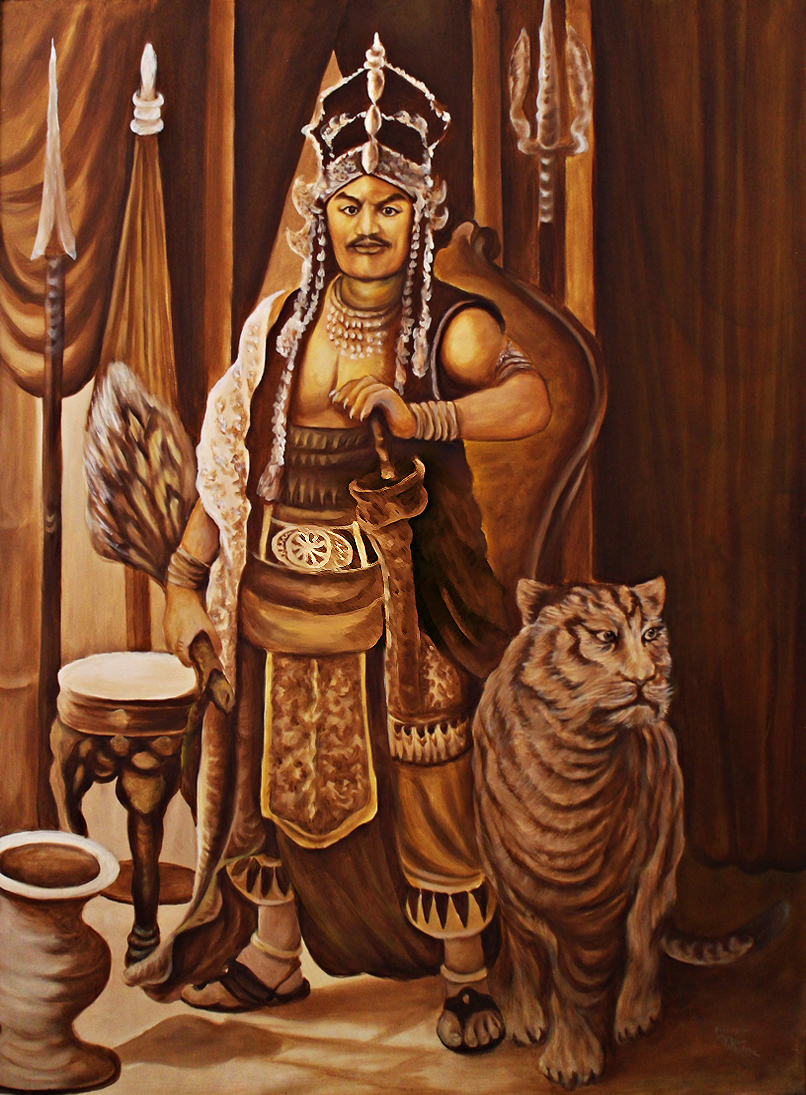
A depiction Sri Baduga Maharaja is a famous King in Sunda kingdom.

Some historians suggest that this legendary King can be identified with an actual historical figure Sri Baduga Maharaja or King Jayadewata, as mentioned in the Batutulis inscription, he is the son of Rahyang Niskala and the grandson of Rahyang Niskala Wastu Kancana. Indeed, King Jayadewata is the most widely believed as the real historical character behind the legend of King Siliwangi. In pantun oral tradition, King Siliwangi is often referred to as Raden Pamanah Rasa or Ratu Jayadewata, which is the other name of Sri Baduga Maharaja.

One of the Pantun legends tells vividly about a beautiful royal procession of Queen Ambetkasih and her courtiers moving to the new capital of Pakuan Pajajaran, where her husband, King Siliwangi awaits. The character described as King Siliwangi in this verse matched perfectly with the real historical person of King Jayadewata since he was the king who moved the capital city from Kawali to Pakuan Pajajaran in 1482.

=== Nilakendra ===
Another popular tale of King Siliwangi suggests that he was the last king of Sunda Kingdom. Tradition tells that after the fall of Pakuan, the last king of Sunda, accompanied by a few of his faithful followers, retreated into the highland wilderness of Mount Salak located south of the capital to avoid further bloodshed. It was said that the king retreated instead, to avoid fighting his kin, since the invading forces of Sultanate Banten and Cirebon were his extended relatives. Then the king is ngahyang (he disappeared) to become a hyang or spirit. He turned into a mythical beast, the sacred tiger.

The King Siliwangi mentioned in this tale, matched the real historic character of King Nilakendra or Tohaan di Majaya of Pakuan. It was during his reign that Sunda capital of Dayeuh Pakuan Pajajaran was captured by Sultan Hasanuddin of Banten. Around the 1550s Hasanuddin, sultan of Banten launched a successful attack on Dayeuh Pakuan, captured and razed the capital. The surviving Sunda royalties, nobles, and common people fled the fallen city, heading to the mountainous wilderness. To disable the authority of the Sunda royal institution, the Sultan of Banten seized the sacred stone of Palangka Sriman Sriwacana, and took it as a prized plunder to his capital, the port city of Banten. According to tradition, this sacred stone slab is an essential requirement for the enthronement ceremony, thus disabling the surviving house of Sunda royals to properly crown their new king.

== Legacy ==
Through the transmission of Pantun Sunda oral tradition, the Sri Baduga's reign is remembered as the peaceful and prosperous golden age in Sundanese history, as the cultural identity and the source of pride for Sundanese people. The kings of the Sultanate of Cirebon still trace their ancestry to Sundanese King Siliwangi, it probably served as the source of legitimacy of their reign in West Java. The TNI Siliwangi Military Division and Siliwangi Stadium were named after King Siliwangi, the eponymous popular king of Sunda corresponding to Sri Baduga Maharaja. His name is honored as the name of the West Java province museum, Sri Baduga Museum in Bandung. Balinese Hindus built a candi shrine dedicated to King Siliwangi in the Hindu temple Pura Parahyangan Agung Jagatkarta, Bogor.

== See also ==
- Gunung Padang
- Sunda Kingdom
- Siliwangi Division
