= Sri Baduga Maharaja =

Sundanese Hindu emperor (1482–1521)

- Prebu Naléndraputra Permana; Prabu Guru Dewataprana
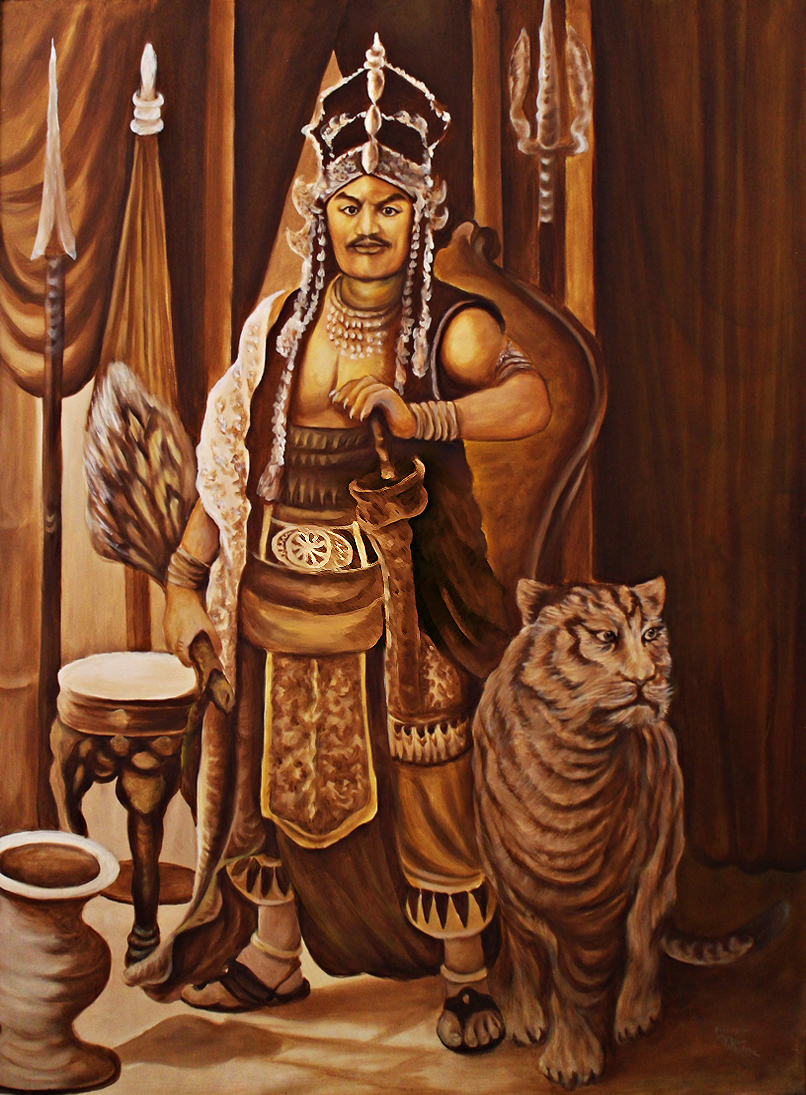
- Modern artist's impression of Sri Bduga Maharaja

40th Maharaja of Sunda 1st Maharaja of Pajajaran
- Reign: 1482 – 1521
- Predecessor: Prabu Dewa Niskala (as Galuh Kingdom); Prabu Susuk Tunggal (as Sunda Kingdom)
- Successor: Surawisesa
- Born: Jayadewata Pamanah Rasa; 1401; Kawali, Galuh Kingdom
- Died: 1521 (aged 119–120); Pakuan Pajajaran, Sunda Kingdom
- Spouse: Nyai Subang Larang
Regnal name
- Prabu Guru Dewataprana Sri Baduga Maharaja Ratu Haji di Pakuan Pajajaran Sri Sang Ratu Dewata
Posthumous name
- Sang Mwakta Ring Rancamaya
- House: Siliwangi
- Father: Prabu Dewa Niskala
- Religion: Hinduism Dharma

Sri Baduga Maharaja (Sundanese: ᮞᮢᮤ ᮘᮓᮥᮌ ᮙᮠᮛᮏ), also known as Sang Ratu Jayadewata (born 1401) was the king of the Hindu Sunda kingdom in West Java, reigned 1482 to 1521 from his capital in Pakuan Pajajaran. He brought his kingdom greatness and prosperity.

King Jayadewata was often linked with King Siliwangi, the semi-legendary great king of Sunda. Sri Baduga's reign was remembered as the age of peace and prosperity among Sundanese people. Some historian suggests, that the legendary mythological king Siliwangi of Pajajaran, popular in Sundanese oral tradition and literature, was actually based upon him. However, other historian suggests that the legand of King Siliwangi might be inspired by other Sunda king.

== Historiography ==
The historical record of his reign can be found in Batutulis inscription, discovered in the area of Bogor, where he is known in his formal stylized name Sri Baduga Maharaja Ratu Haji di Pakwan Pajajaran Sri Sang Ratu Dewata. The inscription was created not during Sri Baduga's reign, but later in 1533 by Sri Baduga's son, King Surawisesa, to honor and commemorate his late father.

== Reign ==
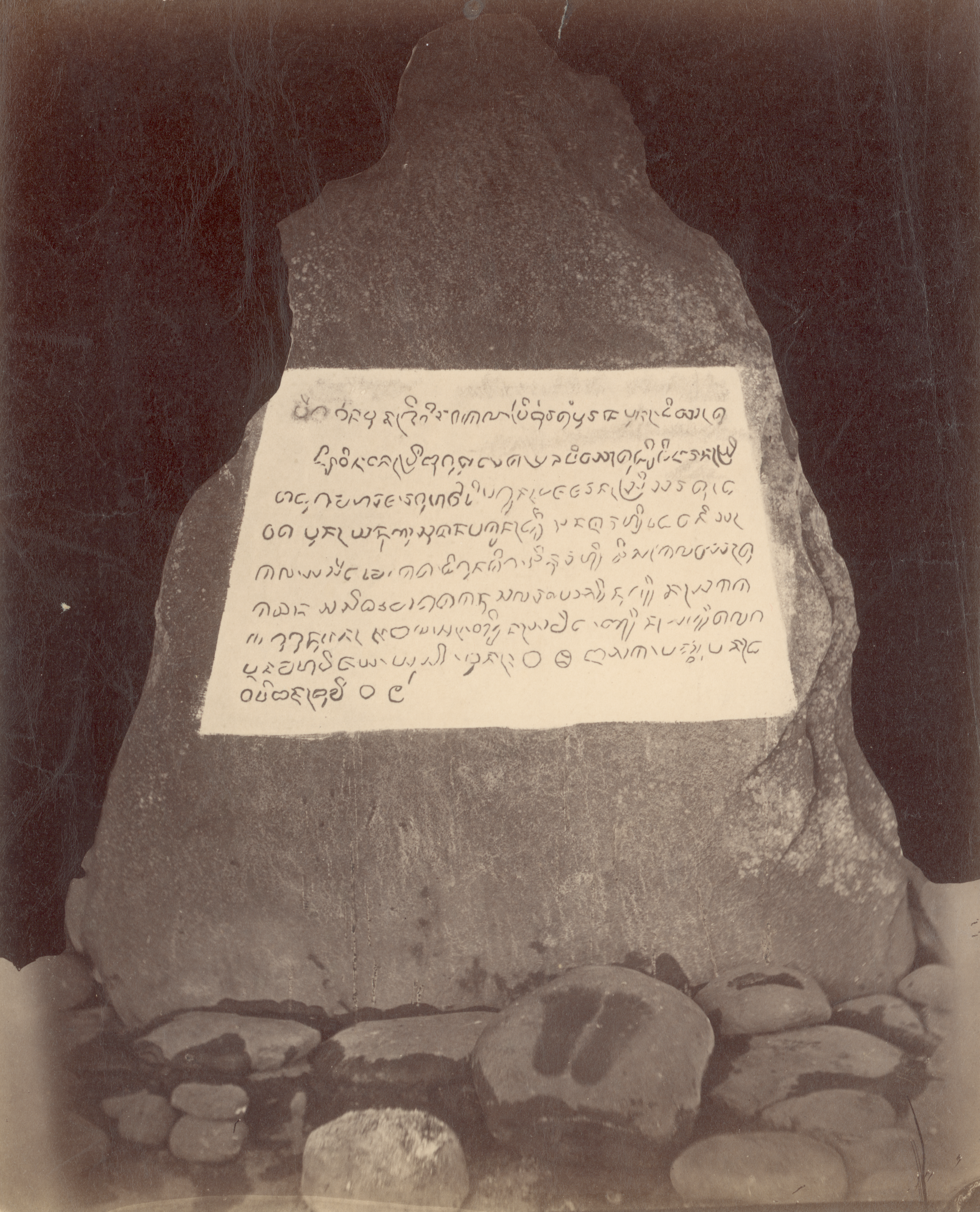
Batutulis inscription in Bogor (before it's called Pakuan Pajajaran) mentioned about the historical great king Sri Baduga Maharaja.

The stylized name: Sri Baduga Maharaja Ratu Haji di Pakwan Pajajaran Sri Sang Ratu Dewata literally means "His Majesty Maharaja King of Pakuan Pajajaran, His Excellency King of deities". Most of literature recognize his name as Sri Baduga Maharaja while other argues that it was only the title to address the king, as Baduga corresponds to paduka, the footwear of kings. According to Hindu etiquette the king is held in such high regard that common people should not directly address the king by his name, but through his shoes.

According to Batutulis inscription, he is the son of Rahyang Niskala and the grandson of Rahyang Niskala Wastu Kancana. King Jayadewata become the king of the unified kingdom of Sunda and Galuh. He transferred the capital city from Kawali Galuh to Pakuan Pajajaran. One of the Pantun legends tells vividly about a beautiful royal procession of queen Ambetkasih and her courtiers moving to the new capital of Pakuan Pajajaran, where her husband awaits.

The Batutulis inscriptions mentioned that the King has embarked in several public projects. Among others are erecting the wall and dug the defensive moat around his capital in Pakuan (modern Bogor), built Gugunungan religious sacred mounds, built Balay or pavilions, also created Samida forest as a conservation forest. He also built a dam and create a lake called Sanghyang Talaga Rena Mahawijaya. The lake is probably functioned as hydraulic project for rice agricultural purpose, and also a recreational lake to beautify his capital city.

== See also ==
- Sunda Kingdom
- Sundanese people
- Agama Hindu Dharma
- Hinduism in Java
- Hinduism in Indonesia

== Bibliography ==
- Atja (1968), Tjarita Parahijangan: Titilar Karuhun Urang Sunda Abad Ka-16 Masehi. Bandung: Jajasan Kebudajaan Nusalarang.
- Berg, C.C., (1938), "Javaansche Geschiedschrijving" dalam F.W. Stapel (ed.,) Geschiedenis van Nederlandsch Indie. Jilid II:7-48. Amsterdam. Diterjemahkan oleh S.Gunawan (1974), Penulisan Sejarah Jawa, Jakarta: Bhratara.
- Brandes, J.L.A., (1911) "Babad Tjerbon" Uitvoerige inhouds-opgave en Noten door Wijlen Dr.J.L.A.Brandes met inleiding en tekst, uitgegeven door Dr.DA.Rinkes. VBG. LIX. Tweede Druk. Albrecht & Co. -'sGravenhage.
- Djoko Soekiman (1982), Keris Sejarah dan Funsinya. Depdikbud-BP3K Yogyakarta. Proyek Javanologi.
- Girardet, Nikolaus et al. (1983), Descriptive Catalogue of the Javanese Manuscripts. Wiesbaden: Franz Steiner Verlag.
- Graaf, H.J. (1953), Over het Onstaant de Javaanse Rijkskroniek. Leiden.
- Olthof, W.L. ed., (1941), Poenika Serat Babad Tanah Djawi Wiwit Saking Adam Doemoegi ing Taoen 1647. 'Gravenhage.
- Padmasusastra, Ki (1902), Sajarah Karaton Surakarta-Ngayogyak arta. Semarang-Surabaya: Van Dorp.
- Pigeaud, Th. G.Th., (1967–1980), Literature of Java, 4 Jilid. The Hague: Martinus Nijhoff.
- Pradjasujitna, R.Ng., (1956), Tjatatan Ringkas Karaton Surakarta. Cetakan Ketiga. Sala: Tigalima.
- Ricklefts, M.C dan p. Voorhoeve (1977), Indonesian Manuscripts in Great Britain, Oxford university Press.
- Sartono Kartodirdjo et al., (1975), Sejarah Nasional Indonesia II. Departemen Pendidikan dan Kebudayaan. Jakarta. PN Balai Pustaka.
- Sumodiningrat Mr.B.P.H., (1983), Pamor Keris. depdiknud BP3K. Yogyakarta: Proyek Javanologi.
