= Pantun Sunda =

Pantun Sunda is a type of Sundanese oral narrative performance interspersed with songs and music played on a kacapi, a kind of zither. A pantun is intended to be recited during an evening-length performance during which a single performer relates the story of a hero's initiation: The protagonist leaves his kingdom to seek experiences, beautiful princesses to become his wife, power, other kingdoms to the subject, the realization of a dream (Rosidi 1984a:143); after having succeeded in reaching his goal he finally returns to his kingdom. Alongside descriptions of historical events, the stories often contain mythical elements. Pantun were originally not written down, the bards often being illiterate and in many cases blind. Originally the performances had a sacred character, as was clear from the offerings made at the beginning of the recitation and also from the content of the introductory part of the story, called rajah, which was an invocatory song, imploring the help of divine figures to ward off bad influences. The linguistic form of the pantun was not strictly fixed, however, the dominant form employed in most pantun is the octosyllabic verse. For a detailed description of the nature and form of a Sundanese pantun you are referred to Eringa (1949), to Hermansoemantri (1977–79).

Currently, there are few Pantun Sunda shows performed, due to a decline in popularity of the form following the widespread introduction of radio and television in households throughout West Java.

== Transcription of pantun stories ==
Pantun, being oral texts, were not written down in the Sundanese literary tradition; only late in the nineteenth century were the first pantun put down in writing (in the beginning usually in cacarakan script) at the instigation of Western (Dutch) enthusiasts. After the establishment of Indonesia, Sundanese scholars made important contributions to the study of pantun, by publishing more oral texts as well as by critically investigating them. Special mention should be made of a project by Ajip Rosidi who in the early seventies had a considerable number of pantun recorded as they were performed by singers from various areas in West Java (see Rosidi 1973). The recorded pantun was transcribed and in stenciled form circulated in a limited circle. Later on, a number of them were published in book form, such as Mundinglaya di Kusumah (1986). An excellent study of the literal structure of the pantun was written by Hermansoemantri (1977–79); Kartini et al. (1984) wrote a useful comparative analysis of the plot of the pantun, based on a survey of 35 pantun stories. A valuable work on the musical aspects of pantun performances, based on extensive data collected in the field, was written by A. N. Weintraub (1990).

In the Sanghyang Siksakanda ng Karesian, dated 1518, pantun are mentioned: "hayang nyaho di pantun ma: Langgalarang, Banyakcatra, Siliwangi, Haturwangi, prepantun tanya" (if you want to know pantun, such as Langgalarang, Banyakcatra, siliwangi, Haturwangi, ask the pantun singer, Atja and Danasasmita 1981a:14). Throughout the ages many ancient elements have been preserved, even though the content of the stories told and the language used underwent changes and adaptations. Not only are there several Arabic words present in many pantun texts, which in pre-Islamic Old Sundanese text are lacking; the repertoire of present-day pantun singers includes Islamic tales as is clear from the list in Weintraub (1990:23-4).

== List of pantun stories ==
Based on Budi Rahayu Tamsyah in his book Kamus Istilah Tata Basa jeung Sastra Sunda, there are pantun stories as follows:

1. Ciung Wanara
2. Lutung Kasarung
3. Mundinglaya di Kusumah
4. Aria Munding Jamparing
5. Banyakcatra
6. Badak Sangorah
7. Badak Singa
8. Bima Manggala
9. Bima Wayang
10. Budak Manjor
11. Budug Basu /Sri Sadana / Sulanjana
12. Bujang Pangalasan
13. Burung Baok
14. Buyut Orenyeng
15. Dalima Wayang
16. Demung Kalagan
17. Deugdeug Pati Jaya Perang / Raden Deugdeug Pati Jaya Perang Prabu Sandap Pakuan
18. Gajah Lumantung
19. Gantangan Wangi
20. Hatur Wangi
21. Jaka Susuruh
22. Jalu Mantang
23. Jaya Mangkurat
24. Kembang Panyarikan / Pangeran Ratu Kembang Panyarikan
25. Kidang Panandri
26. Kidang Pananjung
27. Kuda Gandar
28. Kuda Lalean
29. Kuda Malela
30. Kuda Wangi
31. Langla Larang
32. Langga Sari
33. Langon Sari
34. Layung Kumendung
35. Liman Jaya Mantri
36. Lutung Leutik / Ratu Bungsu Karma Jaya
37. Malang Sari
38. Manggung Kusuma
39. Matang Jaya
40. Munding Jalingan
41. Munding Kawangi
42. Munding Kawati
43. Munding Liman
44. Munding Mintra
45. Munding Sari Jaya Mantri
46. Munding Wangi
47. Nyi Sumur Bandung
48. Paksi Keling / Wentang Gading
49. Panambang Sari
50. Panggung Karaton
51. Parenggong Jaya
52. Raden Mangprang di Kusumah
53. Raden Tanjung
54. Raden Tegal
55. Rangga Sawung Galing
56. Rangga Gading
57. Rangga Katimpal
58. Rangga Malela
59. Rangga Sena
60. Ratu Ayu
61. Ratu Pakuan
62. Ringgit Sari
63. Senjaya Guru
64. Siliwangi
