= Batutulis inscription =

Sunda Kingdom inscription in Java, Indonesia

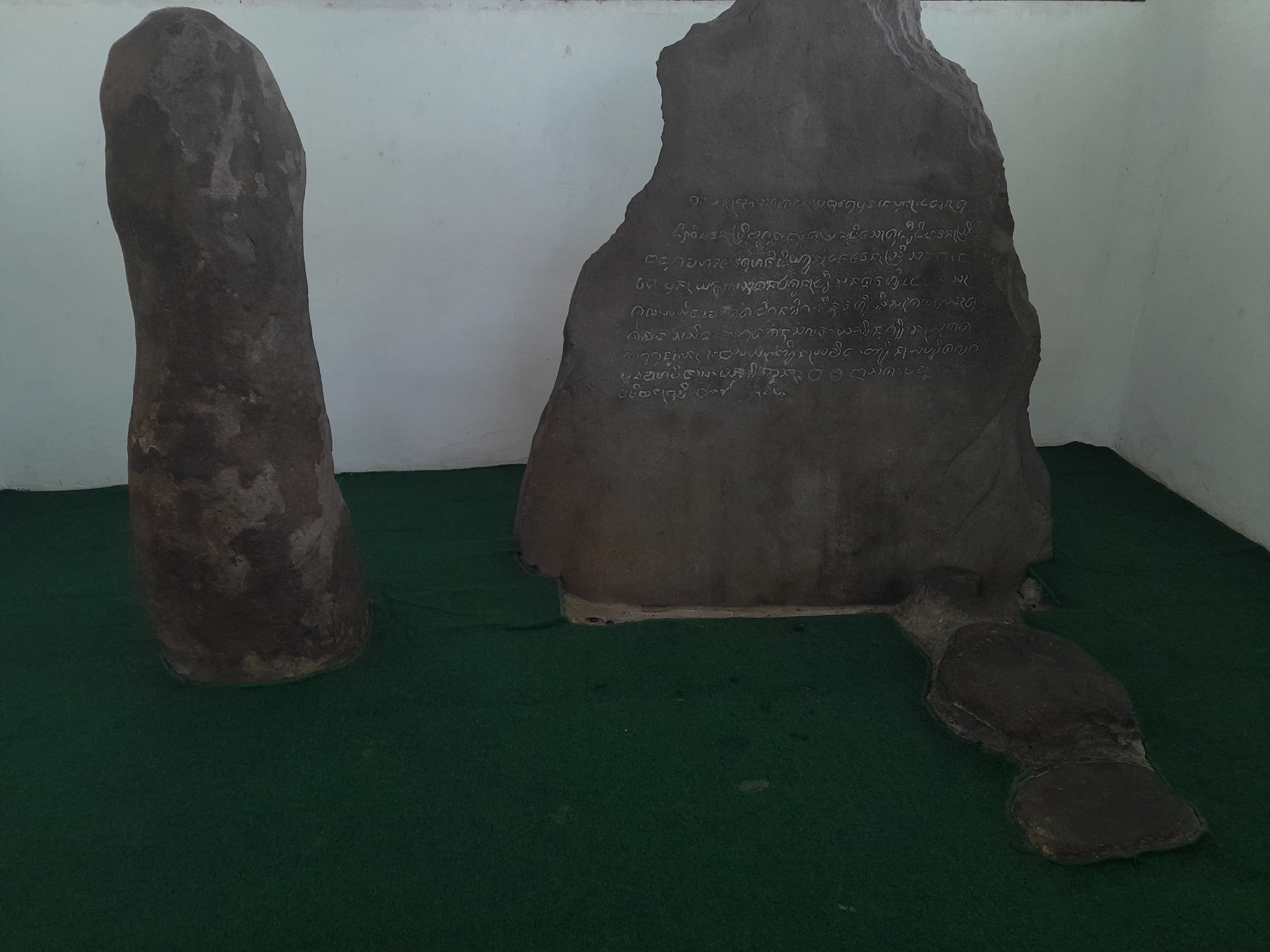
Batutulis Inscription, South Bogor, Bogor.

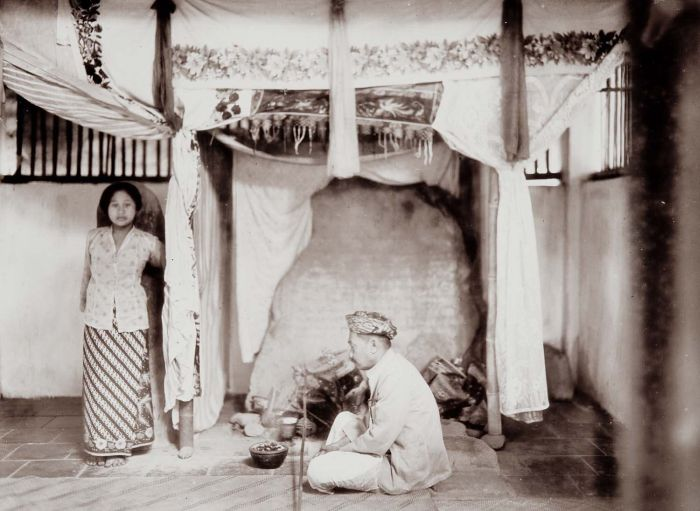
Batutulis inscription in 1920s

The Batutulis inscription is an ancient Sunda Kingdom inscription dated 1533, located at Batutulis village, South Bogor, West Java, in the ancient site of the capital Pakuan Pajajaran, Batutulis means 'inscribed stone', it is this stone which gave name to the village. The complex of Batutulis measures 17 x 15 metres. Several other inscribed stones from the Sunda Kingdom are also located in this location. The inscription was written in the Old Sundanese language using the Kawi script.

The Batutulis inscriptions were created by King Surawisesa in memory of his father, the king Baduga Maharaja (r. 1482 – 1521)

== Content ==
Batutulis inscription has been edited and translated by several scholars, such as Friederich (1853), Karel Frederick Holle (1869), Pleyte (1911), Poerbatjaraka (1921) Noorduyn (1957), and Aditia Gunawan and Arlo Griffiths (2021). The following reading is quoted from Aditia Gunawan and Griffiths' edition:

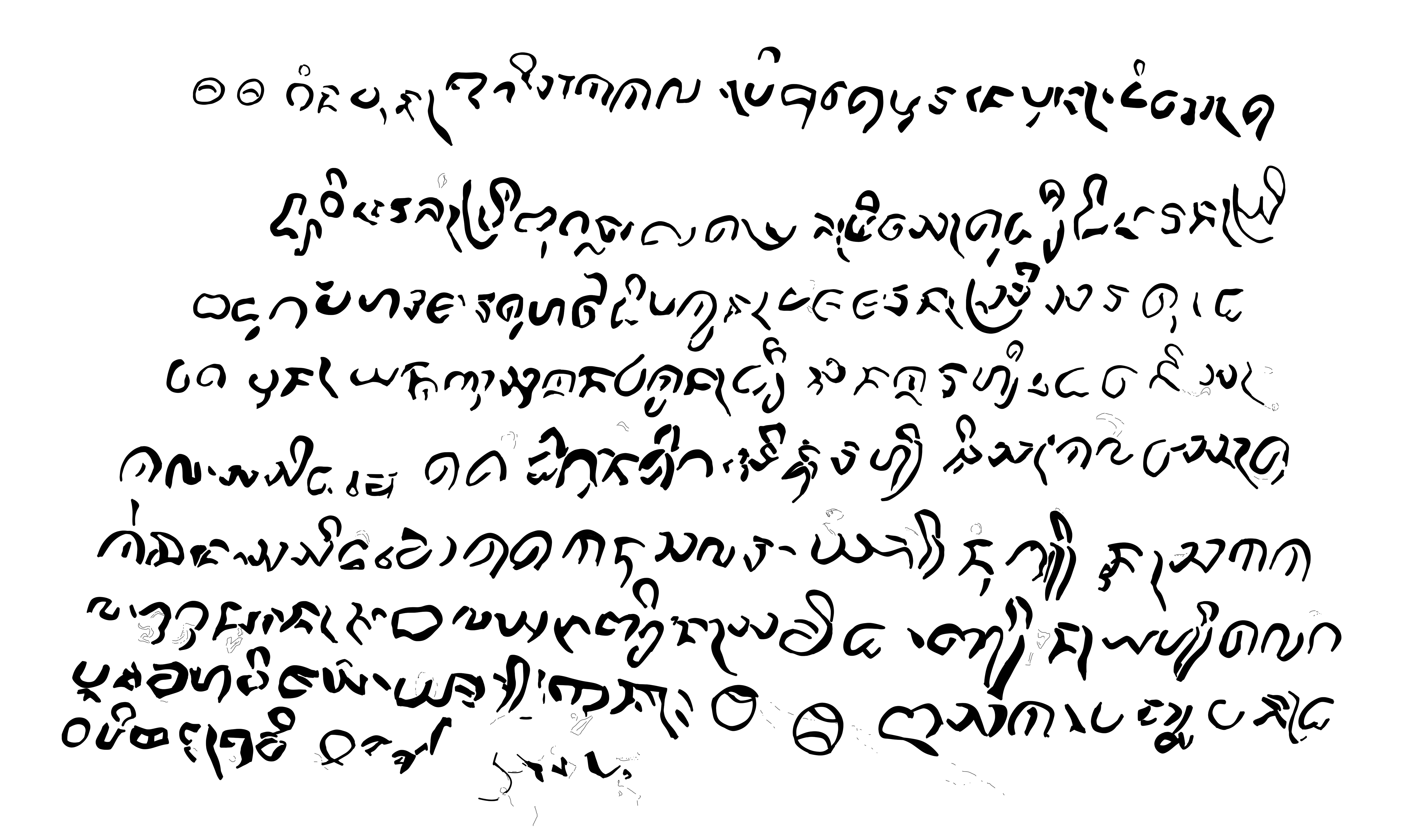
Batutulis Inscription texts

1. Ø Ø vaṁ(ṅ) a‹m›(p)un· I(n)i sakakala, pr(ə)bu ratu pura:na pun·, ḍivas·tu
2. ḍyi, viṅaran· prəbu guru ḍe(va)ta p(ra)n· ḍivas·tu ḍyə ḍiṅaran· sri
3. baduga maharaja, ratu ha(j)i ḍi pakvan· pajajaran· sri sa‹ṁ› ratu ḍe-
4. vata pun· ya nu ñusuk· na pakvan· ḍyə Anak· rahyi‹ṁ› ḍeva nis·-
5. kala, sa‹ṁ› siḍa mok(·)ta ḍi gunuṁ tiga, qə‹ñ›cu rahyiṁ (n)is·kala vas·tu
6. ka‹ñ›ca:na, saṁ siḍa mok·ta ka nusa laraṁ, ya syi nu (ñ)yin· sakaka-
7. la, gugun(uṅ)an·, (ṅa)balay·, ñyin· samiḍa, ñyin· saṁ hyi‹ṁ› talaga [va-]
8. R̥ na mahavijaya, ya syi pun·, ØØ I saka, pañca pan·ḍa-
9. va ṅ(ə)‹m›ban· bumi Ø Ø

== Translation ==
The English translation quoted here is by Aditia Gunawan and Arlo Griffiths (2021):

Om, pardon [any errors]. This is the memorial of his majesty the former king, inaugurated here with the name Prabu Guru Déwata, (and also) inaugurated here with the name Sri Baduga Maharaja, king of kings in Pakwan Pajajaran, Sri Sang Ratu Déwata. He is the one who demarcated Pakwan here, (being) the child of Rahyang Dewa Niskala, the one who vanished at Gunung Tiga; the grandchild of Rahyang Niskala Wastu Kancana, the one who vanished to Nusa Larang. He, that one, produced the commemoration monument, artificial hill, cladded [it] with stone; he produced the ritual ground (samiḍa); he produced the holy Color Lake. Greatly victorious was he! In the year: “the five Pandawas guard the earth” (i.e. in 1455 Śaka).
