= Majapahit–Sundanese conflicts =

14th- and 15th-century conflicts in Java

Majapahit Sundanese conflicts
Date	c. 14th century – 1487
Location	Trowulan and Lampung
Result	Indecisive
Territorial changes	Majapahit took part of Cilacap, but permanently lose Lampung; Unification of Sunda and Galuh in 1482; Decline and collapse of both kingdoms during the Spread of Islam.

Belligerents
Majapahit	Sunda Kingdom; Galuh Kingdom Sunda–Galuh Kingdom (Note: After unification of Sunda and Galuh in 1482.)

Commanders and leaders
Gajah Mada	Maharaja Lingga Buana †; Dyah Pitaloka ‡‡ Sri Baduga Maharaja

Strength
Large number of troops (Bubat)	2,200 vessels (not all present during the battle) (Bubat)

Casualties and losses
Unknown	Sunda: Almost all perished (Bubat)

Majapahit–Sundanese conflicts was a conflicts between Majapahit and Sunda–Galuh Kingdom since c. 14th century until 1487. Located in Bubat square in Trowulan and Lampung. This conflict between these kingdoms was very popular in history of Java.

== Background ==
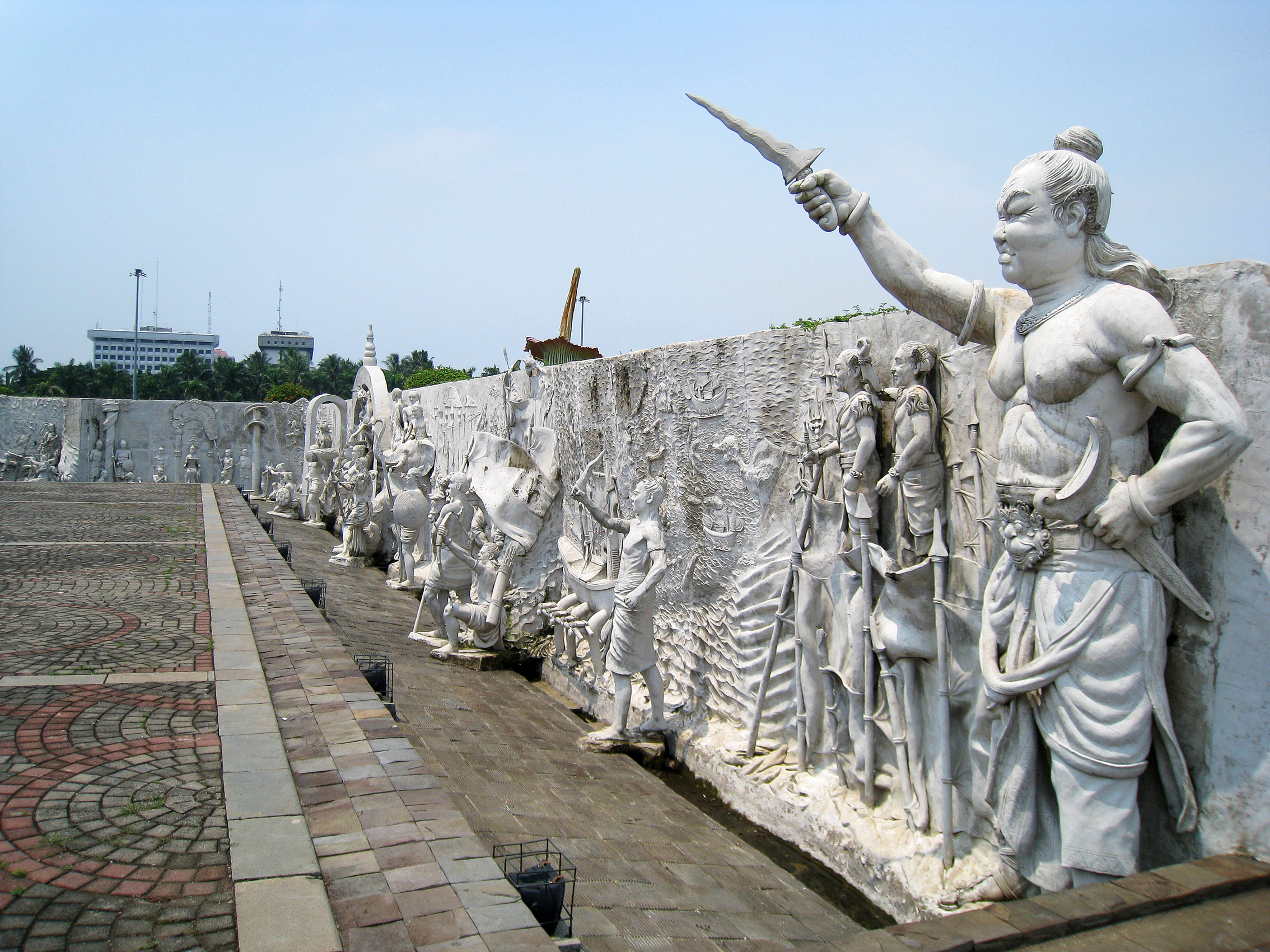
High relief at Monas in Jakarta, depicting Gajah Mada taking his Palapa oath.

This conflict was backgrounded by Gajah Mada's Palapa oath (Sumpah Palapa) of which he said: "If I have conquered the Nusantara Archipelago, [then] I will amukti palapa. If [I have] conquered Gurun, Seran, Tanjungpura, Haru, Pahang, Dompo, Bali, Sunda, Palembang, Tumasik, then I will amukti palapa." Sunda is part of Sumpah Palapa. hence Gajah Mada sought to conquer the Sunda.

== History ==
=== Battle of Bubat ===
Hayam Wuruk, king of Majapahit decided — probably for political reasons — to take Princess Citraresmi (also known as Dyah Pitaloka) as his spouse. She was a daughter of Prabu Maharaja Linggabuana Wisesa of the Sunda Kingdom. Tradition describes her as a girl of extraordinary beauty. Gajah Mada, the Majapahit prime minister saw the event as an opportunity to demand Sunda's submission to Majapahit overlordship and insisted that instead of becoming queen of Majapahit, the princess was to be presented as a token of submission and treated as a mere concubine of the Majapahit king. The Sunda king was angered and humiliated by Gajah Mada's demand and decided to go back home as well as cancel the royal wedding.

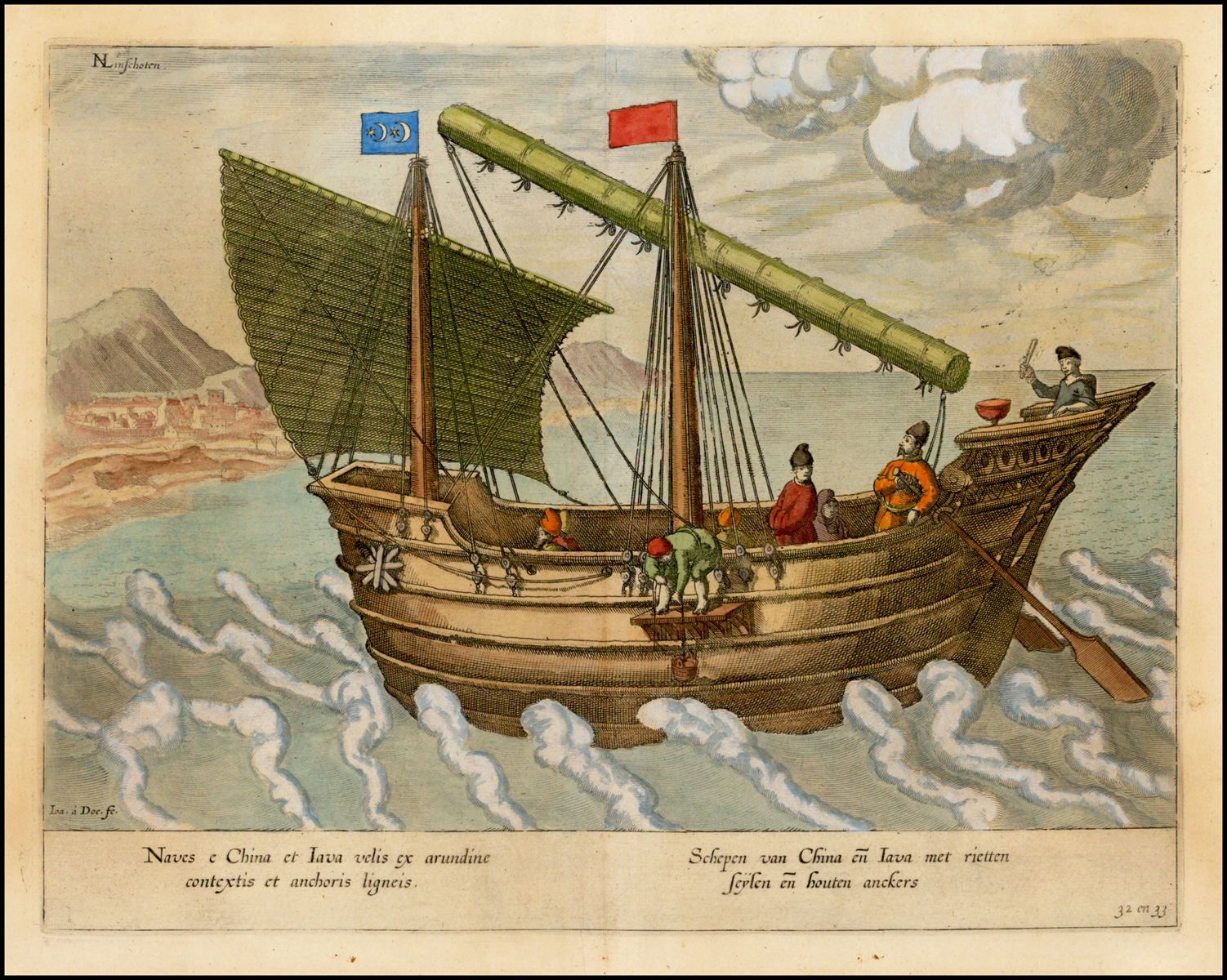
The Sundanese royal party arrived at the port of Hujung Galuh by jong sasanga wangunan, a type of Javanese junk, which also incorporates Chinese techniques, such as using iron nails alongside wooden dowels, the construction of watertight bulkhead, and the addition of central rudder.

However, Majapahit demanded the hand of the Sundanese princess and besieged the Sunda encampment. As a result, a skirmish took place in Bubat square between the Majapahit army and the Sundanese royal family in defense of their honour. It was uneven and unfairly matched since the Sundanese party was composed mostly of the royal family, state officials, and nobles, accompanied by servants and royal guards. The numbers of the Sundanese party were estimated at fewer than a hundred. On the other hand, the armed guards stationed within Majapahit capital city under Gajah Mada's command were estimated at several thousand well-armed and well-trained troops. The Sundanese party was surrounded in the center of the Bubat square. Some sources mentioned that the Sundanese managed to defend the square and strike back at the Majapahit siege several times. However, as the day went on the Sundanese were exhausted and overwhelmed. Despite facing certain deaths, the Sundanese demonstrated extraordinary courage and chivalry as one by one, all of them fell.

The Sundanese king was killed in a duel with a Majapahit general as well as other Sundanese nobles with almost all of the Sundanese royal party massacred in the tragedy. Tradition says that the heartbroken princess — along with very possibly all remaining Sundanese women — took her own life to defend the honour and dignity of her kingdom. The ritualized suicide by the women of the kshatriya (warrior) class after the defeat of their menfolk, is supposed to defend their pride and honour as well as to protect their chastity, rather than facing the possibility of humiliation through rape, subjugation, or enslavement.

Hayam Wuruk was deeply shocked by the tragedy. Majapahit courtiers, ministers and nobles blamed Gajah Mada for his recklessness, and the brutal consequences were not to the taste of the Majapahit royal family. Gajah Mada was promptly demoted and spent the rest of his days at the estate of Madakaripura in Probolinggo in East Java.

=== Sundanese domination of Lampung ===
Niskala Wastu Kancana, King of Sunda–Galuh, traveled to Lampung. In Lampung, he married the daughter of the King of Lampung, named Lara Sarkati. This and another marriage became the prime factors in Sundanese domination and unification with the Lampung Kingdom. As the result, the Sundanese gained Lampung region from Majapahit.

== Aftermath ==
After several battles and conflicts, the outcome of this conflict of rivalry between Sunda Kingdom and Majapahit was very bloody and dramatic. however, from this conflict Sunda Kingdom gains Lampung as result from marriage and domination, and Majapahit gains part of Cilacap region as result from Battle of Bubat.

== Legacy ==
The conflict is believed to have caused the ill sentiments of Sundanese-Javanese animosity for generations. For example, unlike most Indonesian cities, until recently in Bandung, West Java's capital city also the cultural center of Sundanese people, there is no street name bearing the name "Gajah Mada" or "Majapahit". Although today Gajah Mada is considered an Indonesian national hero, Sundanese people still do not find him deserving based on his wicked deed in this incident. And vice versa, until recently, there was no street bearing the names of "Siliwangi" or "Sunda" in Surabaya and Yogyakarta.

The conflict also caused a myth to revolve around Indonesians, which forbids marriage between a Sundanese and a Javanese, as it would be unsustainable and only bring misery to the couple.
