= Palapa (disambiguation) =

Palapa is a series of Indonesian communications satellites.

Palapa may also refer to:

- Palapa (structure), a thatched roof made of palm tree leaves, common in Central America and Mexico.
- Palapa oath, the historic oath of Gajah Mada
- Palapa (condiment), a Filipino condiment originating from the Maranao people
