= Astana Gede inscriptions =

Inscriptions in West Java, Indonesia

The Astana Gede inscriptions, also known as Kawali inscriptions, refer to six inscriptions discovered in the Kabuyutan Kawali area, Ciamis Regency, Indonesia; the main inscription (Kawali I) bears the longest scripts. All of the inscriptions were written in the Old Sundanese language and Old Sundanese script. Although the inscription does not contain chandrasangkala (chronogram), the inscription was thought to have originated from the second half of the 14th century, based on the name of the king mentioned in this inscription.

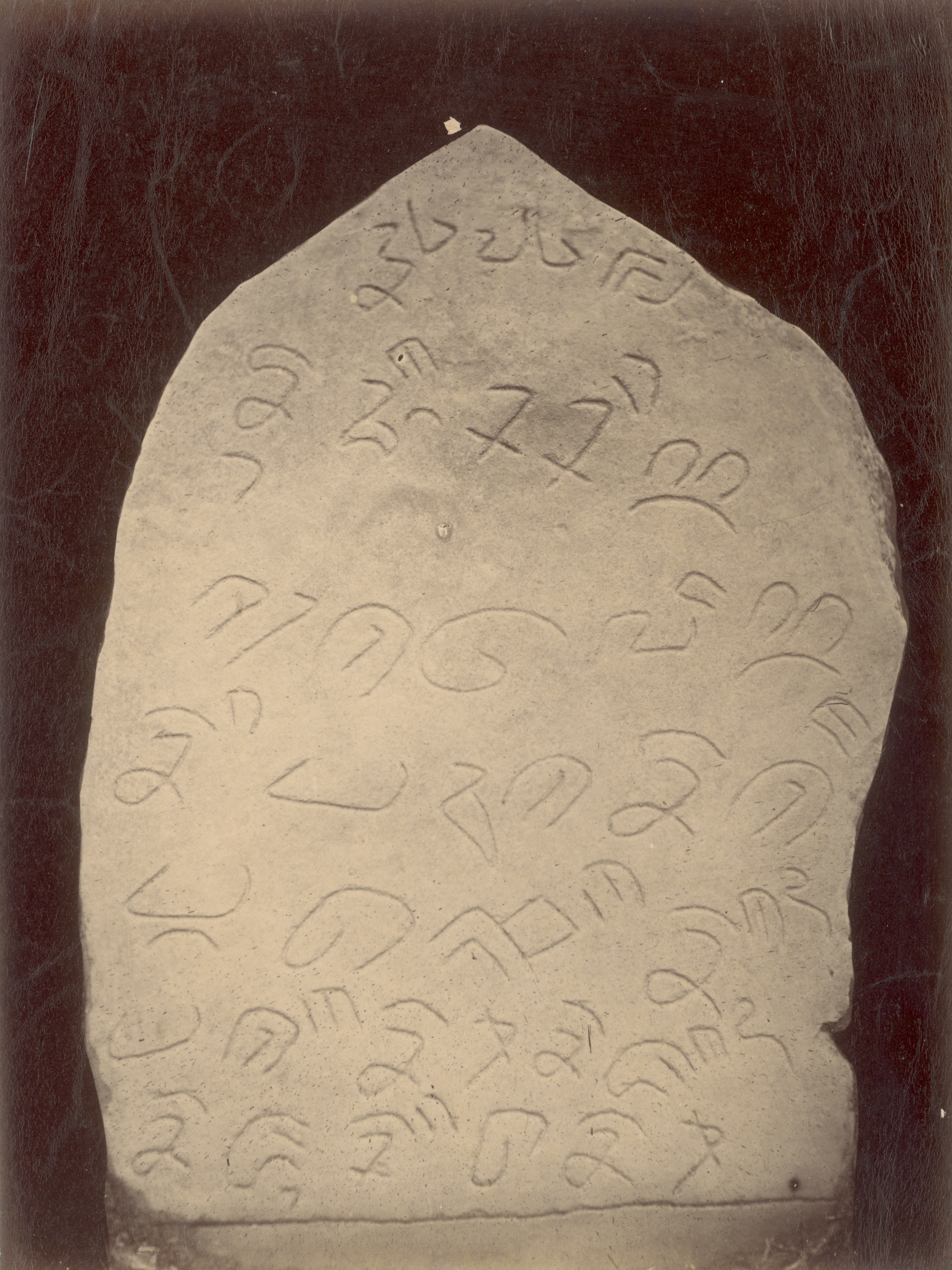
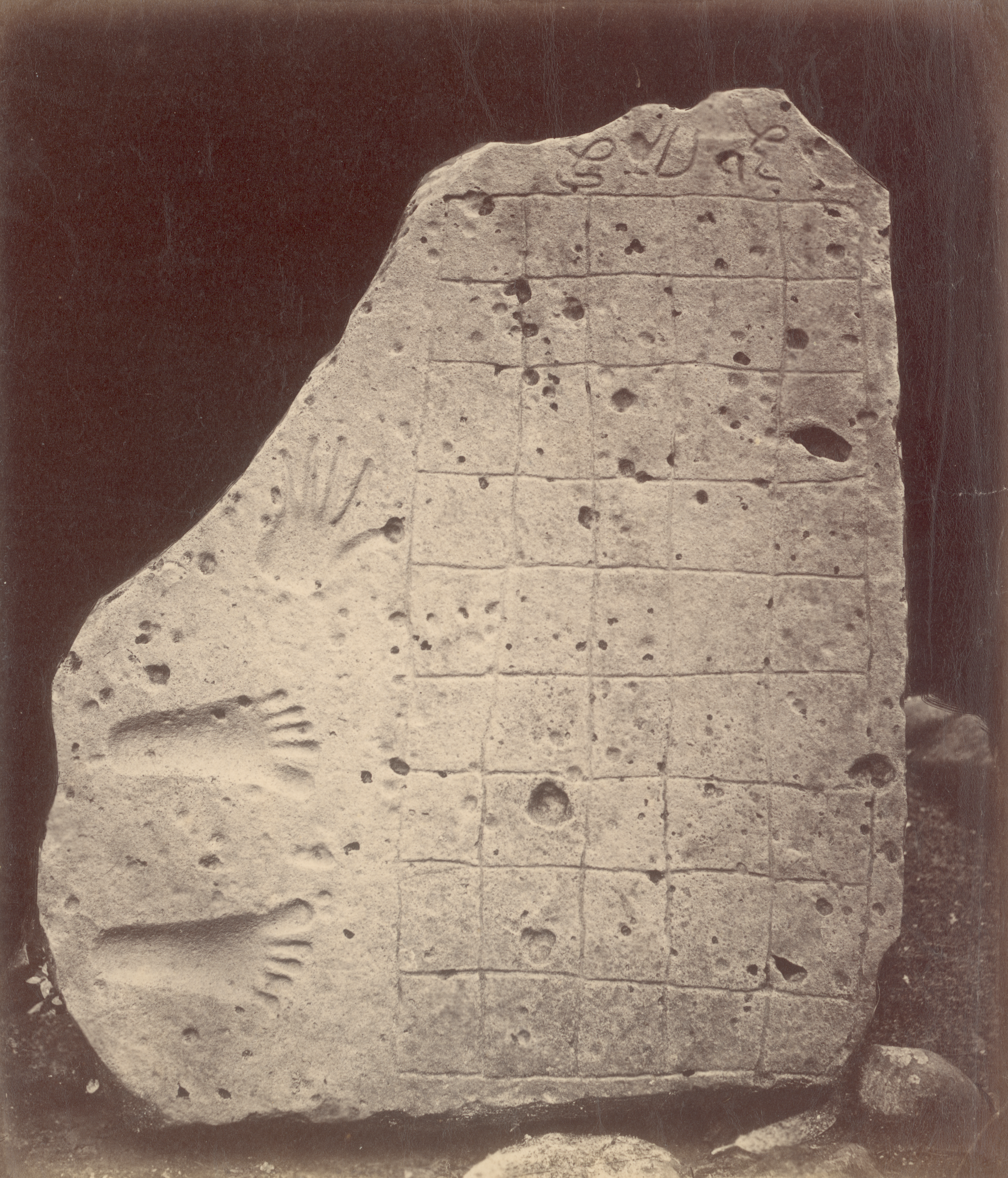
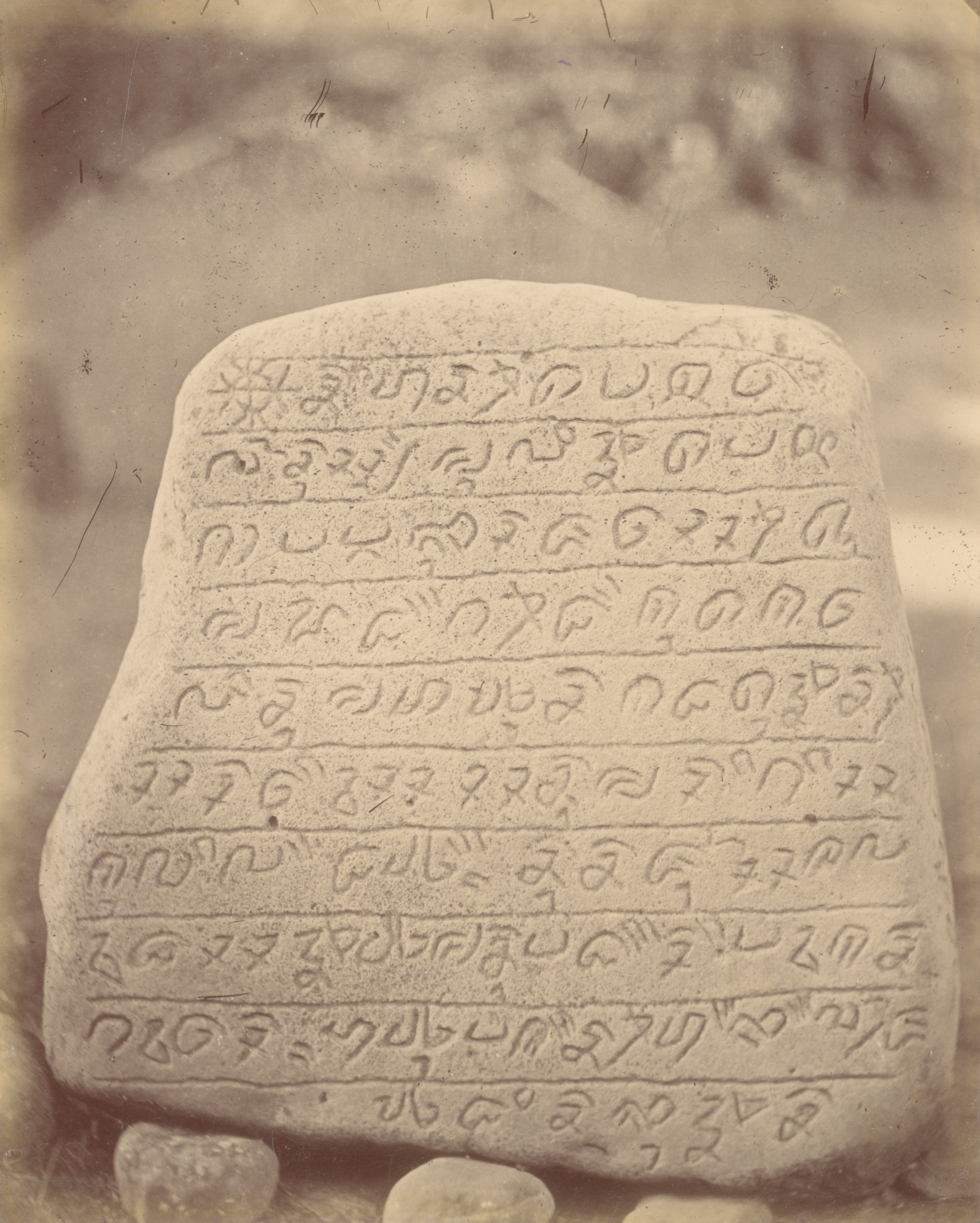
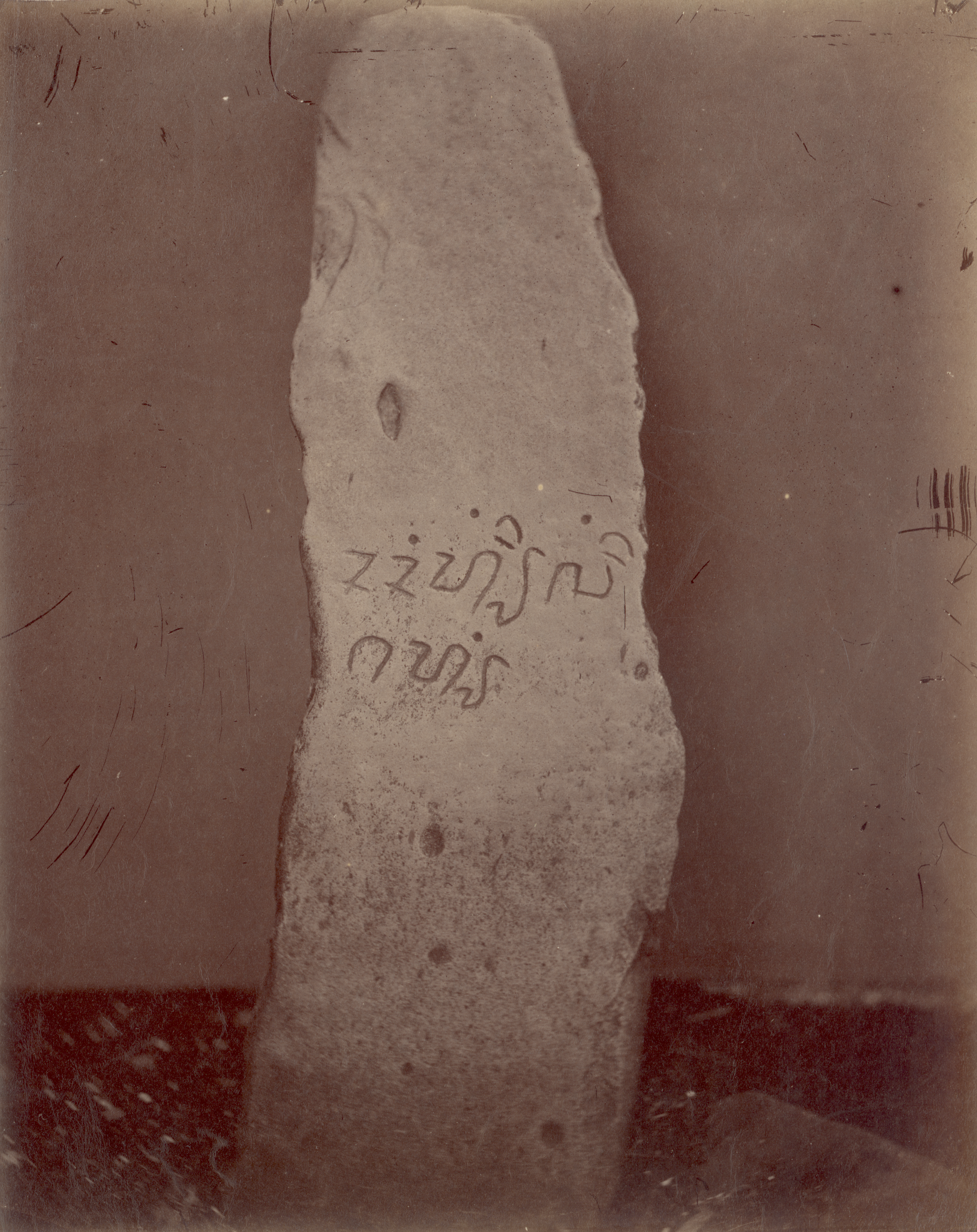
Several stone tablets of Kawali inscriptions

The inscription was compared to other historical sources, such as Carita Parahyangan manuscript, and it was concluded that the Kawali I inscription was meant as a sakakala or commemoration monument to honor the greatness of King Niskala Wastu Kancana, ruler of Sunda ruled from his capital in Kawali. Niskala Wastu Kancana was the sole surviving heir of King Linggabuana, and also the younger brother of Princess Dyah Pitaloka Citraresmi; both died in Bubat Majapahit in 1357.

== Content ==
=== Original text ===
Front:

1. nihan tapa kawa-
2. li nu sang hyang mulia tapa bha-
3. gya parĕbu raja wastu
4. mangadĕg di kuta ka-
5. wali nu mahayuna kadatuan
6. sura wisesa nu marigi sa-
7. kuliling dayĕh. nu najur sakala
8. desa aja manu panderi pakĕna
9. gawe ring hayu pakĕn hebel ja
10. ya dina buana

Text on the side, bold:

1. hayua diponah-ponah
2. hayua dicawuh-cawuh
3. inya neker inya angger
4. inya ninycak inya rempag

=== Translation ===
Front:

This is the trace (in) Kawali (of) his majesty Prabu Raja Wastu (which) erected the defense (ruled in) Kawali city, (who has) renovated Surawisesa palace, constructed the defensive moats surrounding the capital city, (he who) gave prosperity throughout the villages. For those who will visit (this place), they better to perform safety (be cautious) as the foundation for glorious life in the world.

Text on the side, bold:

Do not destroy!
Do not abuse!
Those who honor (it), will remain.
Those who step over (it), will fall.

== See also ==
- Batutulis inscription
