= Niskala Wastu Kancana =

King of the Sunda Kingdom (c. 1348–1475)

- Prabu Raja Wastu; Sang Mokteng Nusalarang

King of Sunda Galuh
- Reign: c. 1357 – c. 1471
- Predecessor: Bunisora
- Successor: Susuk Tunggal, King of Sunda; Dewa Niskala, King of Galuh
- Regent: Bunisora (c. 1371 – c. 1475)
- Born: c. 1348; Kingdom of Sunda Galuh
- Died: 1475
- Burial: Nusa Larang
- Spouse: Lara Sarkati; Dewi Mayangsari
- Issue: Susuk Tunggal, King of Sunda; Dewa Niskala, King of Galuh
Regnal name
- Nusya Mulia Tapa Bhagya Pareubu Raja Wastu Mangadeg Di Kuta Kawali
Posthumous name
- Sang Mokteng Nusa Larang
- House: Siliwangi
- Father: Linggabuana Wisesa, King of Sunda Galuh
- Mother: Dewi Lara Linsing

King Niskala Wastu Kancana (Sundanese: ᮔᮤᮞ᮪ᮊᮜ ᮝᮞ᮪ᮒᮥ ᮊᮔ᮪ᮎᮔ) also known as Prabu Raja Wastu or popularly known as Wastu Kancana (c. 1348 – 1475) was one of the great kings of the Sunda Kingdom reigning throughout most of the 15th century. He was the younger brother of Princess Pitaloka.

According to Carita Parahyangan, he ruled for 104 years, between 1371 – 1475.

== Early life ==
Niskala Wastu Kancana was the youngest son of Prabu Maharaja and the brother of Princess Pitaloka Citraresmi, who, together with most of his family, perished in the Pasunda Bubat incident. In 1357, his family went to Majapahit in East Java to marry his eldest sister, Princess Pitaloka, to Maharaja Hayam Wuruk of Majapahit. As a child, he, however, was left to stay in Kawali palace and did not accompany his family to travel to faraway Trowulan in Majapahit. Gajah Mada, the ambitious prime minister of Majapahit, saw the event as an opportunity to demand the Sunda Kingdom's submission to Majapahit's overlordship. He demanded Princess Pitaloka to be given as a mere concubine, as a token of submission. Enraged, the Sundanese party felt humiliated and refused, thus subsequently violence broke out, and the entire Sundanese royal party was killed, including his parents, sister, and extended family.

As a child, he was considered too young to reign. Subsequently, the throne was delegated under the regency of his tutor and also a relative, Hyang Bunisora, until he came of age. Hyang Bunisora ruled for 14 years until, as a regent, he abdicated in favour of the prince.

== Reign ==
"... nya mana sang Rama e(na)k mangan, sang Resi enak ngaresisasana, ngawakan na Purbatisti, Purbajati. Sang Dis(r)i enak masini ngawakan na manusasana, ngaduman alas pari-alas. Ku beet hamo diukih, ku gede hamo diukih. Nya mana sang Tarahan enak lalayaran ngawakan manurajasasana ... ngawakan sanghiyang rajasasana, angadeg di sanghiyang Linggawesi, brata siya puja tanpa lum. Sang Wiku e(n)ak ngadewasasana ngawakan sanghiyang watangageung, enak ngadeg manu-raja-suniya ..,"
"... thus the village elders eat well, the Rishis peacefully performed their Rishi rule of Purbatisti Purbajati. The medicine men/women peacefully entered into an agreement concerning life, distributing forest and its surrounding, either for the small (weak) and the big (powerful), there is no complain whatsoever. Even the sailors felt safe sailing according to King's rule, hold firmly to King's law, stands on Sanghyang Linggawesi, fasting and praying endlessly. The Wiku (priests) peacefully uphold the gods' rules, adhering to Sanghyang Watangageung. It was also because of his faith, that the King abdicated ..,"

— Carita Parahyangan

In 1371, Prince Wastu ascended to the throne, stylized as Prabu Raja Wastu Kancana. Raja Wastu resided in the Kawali palace of Galuh. Kawali inscription, approximately dated from the second half of the 14th century, mentioned that King Prabu Raja Wastu constructed the defensive structures; walls, and moats surrounding Kawali city, and renovated Surawisesa palace.

The copperplate inscription of Kebantenan I (Jayagiri) reads that Raja Rahyang Niskala Wastu Kancana sent an order through Hyang Ningrat Kancana to the Susuhunan of Pakuan Pajajaran to take care of dayohan in Jayagiri and Sunda Sembawa, banning the collection of collecting taxes from the residents because they were knowledgeable about the (Hindu) religion and worshiped the gods.

== Death and successor ==
The Batutulis inscription dated from a later period, mentioned him as Rahiyang Niskala Wastu Kancana, the father of Rahyang Niskala, and the grandfather of Sri Baduga Maharaja, King of Pakuan Pajajaran. According to Carita Parahyangan, the hundred-year-old king was abdicated and retreated to hermit life. Rahiyang Niskala Wastu Kancana was buried at Nusa Larang (forbidden island), which might be identified as Nusa Kambangan near the estuarine of Ci Tanduy that flows through Galuh Kingdom territory.

Niskala Wastu Kancana's son, named Tohaan di Galuh in Carita Parahyangan, succeeded him as king but reigned for only seven years. Carita Parahyangan says "... kena salah twa(h) bogo(h) ka estri larangan ti kaluaran ..", which translates as "because (his) wrongdoing, fell in love with a forbidden outsider woman".
