= Kawali =

Former capital of Sunda Kingdom

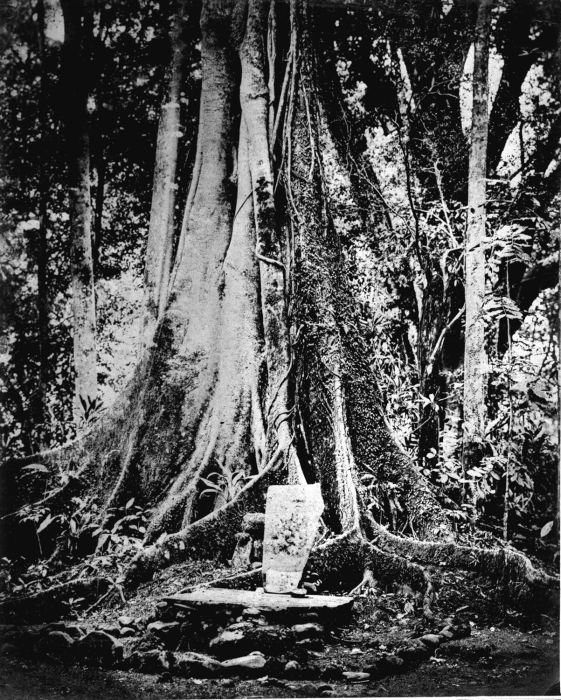
- Sanctuary in Kabuyutan Astana Gede, Kawali.

- Location within Java Location within Indonesia

General information
- Location: Ciamis Regency, West Java., Indonesia
- Coordinates: 7.1900009°S 108.3628508°E

Kawali was the capital of Sunda Kingdom during Galuh period, between early 14th to late 15th century. It is located in present day Astana Gede archaeological site, in Kawali District of Ciamis Regency, in West Java, Indonesia.

== Location ==
The area is located on the eastern slope of Mount Sawal near the source of the Ci Tanduy river, which runs to the southeast to the Segara Anakan lagoon by the Java's southern ocean (Indian Ocean). The ancient city was located approximately 1 kilometres to the southwest from the alun-alun (square or field) of Kawali town.

The Kawali inscriptions, dated from circa late 14th century, were discovered here. The site took form of a park sanctuary filled with large trees and shrubbery. Currently, there are no traces of tangible original structures left in the Astana Gede site, only stone inscriptions placed in small pavilions. It is probably all the buildings, houses, dwellings and palace structures, were all made from organic wooden or thatched materials, similar to today Sundanese traditional house, that has decayed for ages.

== History ==
Previously, prior to 14th century, the Galuh capital was located further southeast near the banks of Ci Tanduy river in the area now known as Karang Kamulyan site, near Ciamis town. It is not clear however, when was the time the Galuh capital was moved here. The inscriptions found here confirm that at least for several generations prior to King Niskala Wastu Kancana, the city were already well populated.

Among the Sunda kings ruled here were King Maharaja Lingga Buana and King Niskala Wastu Kancana. According to tradition mentioned in Carita Parahyangan, the keraton (palace) in Kawali is called Surawisesa, fortified by walls and moats.

Kawali served as the capital of the kingdom for several generations until Sri Baduga Maharaja moved the center of Sunda government to Pakuan Pajajaran in 1482.
