= Kidung =

Form of Old Javanese poetry

Kidung is a form of Old Javanese poetry. They differ from kakawin in that they use Javanese meters instead of imported Sanskrit ones, and mostly appeared later. The subject matter is based on historical events. Like kakawin, they later became an important source of inspiration for pictorial art. They are also distinguished from the tantri, which, though similar in form, are adapted from Indian fables. Many kakawin were also adapted into kidung form.

One group of kidung is based on the Panji (king) romance.

Another group consists of historical romances, relating the history of Singhasari and Majapahit until about 1360, and the Javanese colony on Bali until 1651. These feature lively description, which was enhanced by the naturalness of the Javanese (in contrast to the Sanskrit) meters for the language. The best-known among this group of kidung is the Kidung Sunda.

== List of kidung ==
- Kidung Sunda
- Kidung Sri Tanjung
- Kidung Tantri Demung
