= Palapa oath =

Historic oath of Gajah Mada

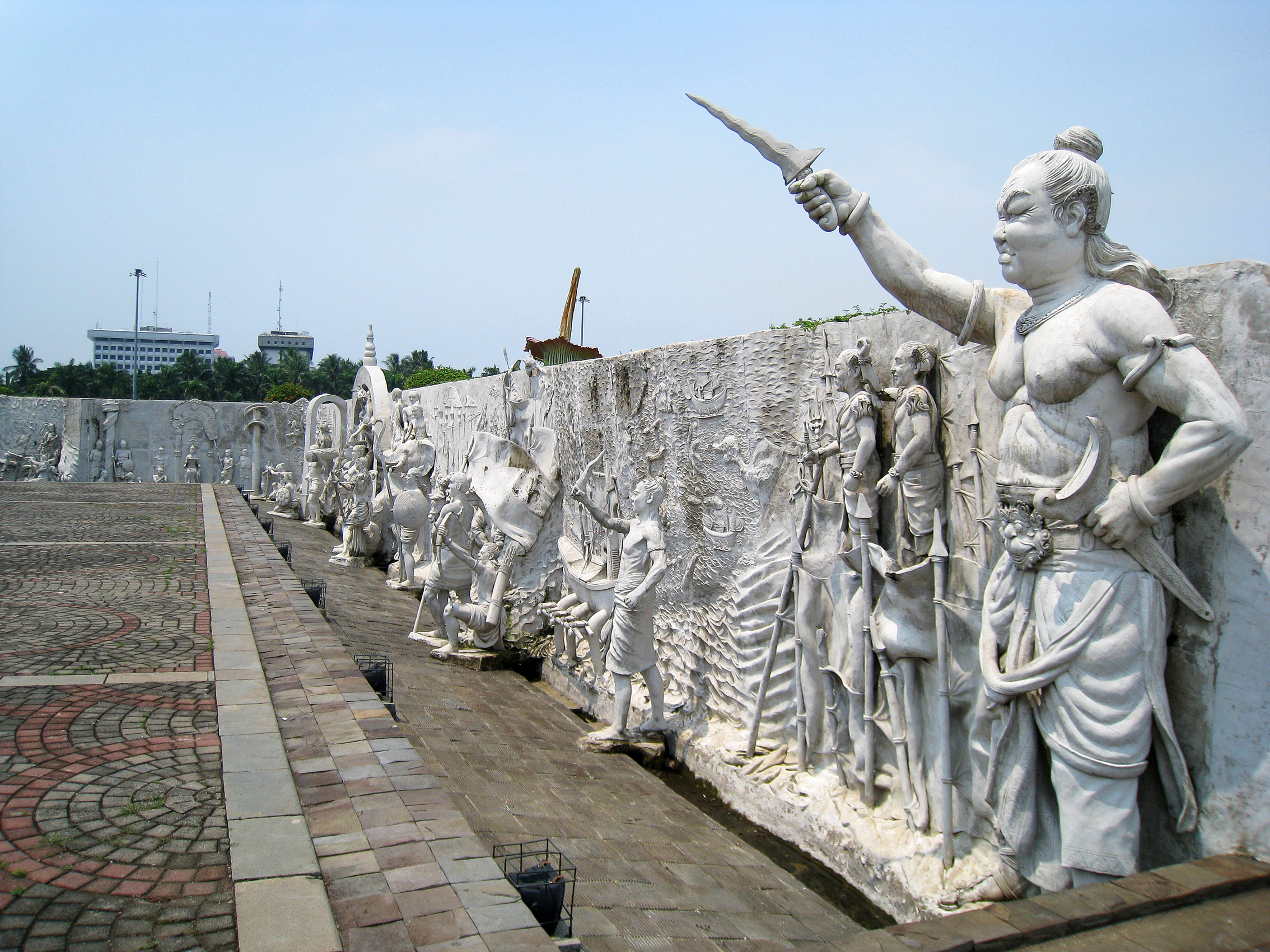
High relief at Monas in Jakarta, depicting Gajah Mada taking his Palapa oath.

The Palapa oath (Indonesian: Sumpah Palapa) was an oath taken by Gajah Mada, a 14th-century Prime Minister of the Javanese Majapahit Empire described in the Pararaton (Book of Kings). In the oath, Gajah Mada swore that he would not rest as long as he had not succeeded in unifying Nusantara (Maritime Southeast Asia). The oath was taken during his inauguration as Majapahit Amangkubhumi (Prime Minister) that took place in 1256 Saka (1334) or 1258 Saka (1336).

== The oath ==
The main source of the Palapa oath is taken from the middle Javanese manuscript, Pararaton, which states:

Sira Gajah Mada patih amangkubhumi tan ayun amuktia palapa, sira Gajah Mada: "Lamun huwus kalah nusantara isun amukti palapa, lamun kalah ring Gurun, ring Seran, Tañjungpura, ring Haru, ring Pahang, Dompo, ring Bali, Sunda, Palembang, Tumasik, samana isun amukti palapa".

Translation:

[Eventually] Gajah Mada became patih mangkubumi, [but] did not want to amukti palapa. Gajah Mada [swore], "If I have conquered the Nusantara Archipelago, [then] I will amukti palapa. If [I have] conquered Gurun, Seram, Tanjungpura, Haru, Pahang, Dompo, Bali, Sunda, Palembang, Tumasik, then I will amukti palapa."

== Interpretation ==
Petrus Josephus Zoetmulder defines amukti palapa as "enjoying a state where everything can be taken," or simply "enjoying pleasure," while according to Slamet Muljana, it means "enjoying rest."

From this manuscript, historians have learnt several names of places and polities in Nusantara that (at the time the oath was taken) were not under Majapahit suzerainty and were targeted by Gajah Mada's ambitious expansive campaign.

=== Places described in Palapa oath ===
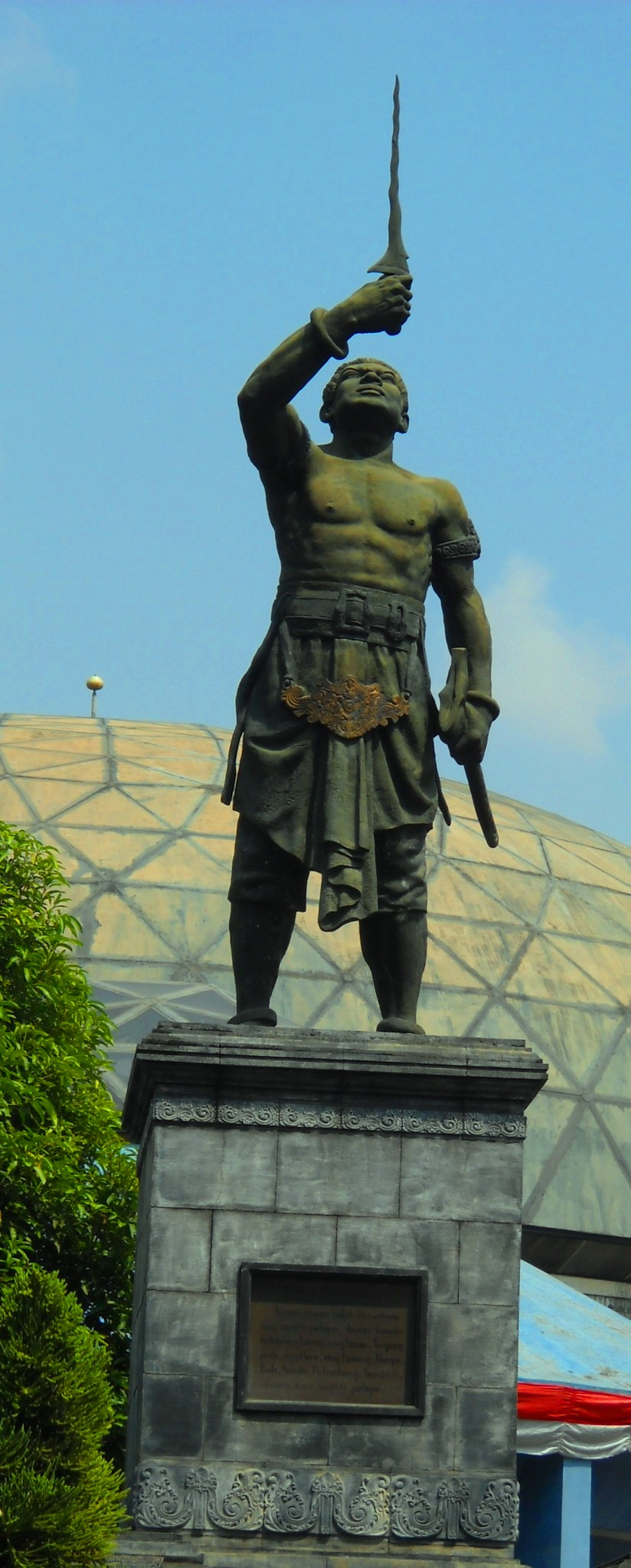
Gajah Mada statue in front of the now-demolished Telecommunication Museum in Taman Mini Indonesia Indah, Jakarta. Palapa, Indonesia's first telecommunication satellite was named after the Palapa oath.

- Gurun = Gorom islands, east of Seram
- Seran = Seram
- Tañjung Pura = Tanjungpura Kingdom, Ketapang Regency, West Kalimantan
- Haru = Aru Kingdom, North Sumatra (Karo)
- Pahang = Pahang, Malaysia
- Dompo = Dompu in Sumbawa island
- Bali = Bali
- Sunda = Sunda Kingdom
- Palembang = Palembang
- Tumasik = Temasek (Singapore)

== Completion ==
It is possible that the Sunda kingdom became vassalized by Majapahit after the Bubat tragedy of 1357. It ultimately regained independence at an unknown year. The subjugation of Sunda by Majapahit means that Gajah Mada has finally fulfilled his Palapa oath:

... Tunggalan padompo pasunda. Samangkana sira Gajah Mada mukti palapa, sawelas tahun amangkubhumi. (The Dompo incident coincided with the Sunda incident. That's when Gajah Mada amukti palapa, [after] eleven years became mangkubumi.)

== Legacy ==
The Palapa oath is used as the name of the Indonesian telecommunication satellite Palapa, a Boeing-made satellite. The program was started in February 1975 and the satellite was launched on 9 July 1976 from Cape Canaveral, United States. The name Palapa was chosen by President Suharto and means 'fruits of labor,' also signifying the Indonesian effort to unify the Indonesian archipelago through telecommunications technology.

A university-wide orientation session for freshman students at Gadjah Mada University was named PPSMB Palapa from its inception in 2012 until its renaming in 2023.

== See also ==
- Nagarakretagama
- Kidung Sunda
- Territories of Majapahit
