= Kidung Sunda =

Middle-Javanese kidung

Palm leaf manuscript of the poem, click for the full archival pdf of the poem.

Kidung Sunda is a Middle-Javanese kidung of probable Balinese provenance. In this poem, the story of King Hayam Wuruk of Majapahit who was looking for a bride-to-be, is narrated. At last, he chose the princess of Sunda, a kingdom in West Java. The princess' name has remained undisclosed in this story, however, she corresponds to Dyah Pitaloka Citraresmi in Pararaton. Hayam Wuruk's grand vizier Gajah Mada, betrayed his king and rejected this idea. There was a dispute about geopolitical relations between Sunda and Majapahit (i.e. Java). Gajah Mada considered Sunda to be a vassal state of Java. For that reason, a great battle took place in Bubat, the port where the Sundanese party landed as they refused to be treated as vassals. There the Majapahit-Javanese army slaughtered the Sundanese. The grieved princess of Sunda committed suicide not long afterward. This historical story has to be situated somewhere in the 14th century.

== Different versions of Kidung Sunda ==
A Dutch philologist, Prof. Dr. C.C. Berg, has found several versions of Kidung Sunda. Out of them he has discussed and published two versions:

1. Kidung Sunda
2. Kidung Suṇḍâyana (The Journey of the Sundanese)

The former is longer than the latter. It also has better literary merits. That is also the version, which is discussed in this article.

== Synopsis ==
A short summary of the contents of Kidung Sunda is presented below. The summary is divided in different cantos.

=== Canto I ===
Hayam Wuruk, the king of Majapahit, was looking for a bride-to-be. He sent emissaries throughout Nusantara (Maritime Southeast Asia) to find a suitable bride for him. They all came back with paintings of lovely princesses. But none was able to charm him. Then Hayam Wuruk heard about the beauty of the princess of Sunda. Accordingly, he sent an artist to Sunda and he came back with a painting. At that moment both his uncles: the king of Kahuripan and the king of Daha were in his palace. Both were concerned about the status of Hayam Wuruk who was still unmarried at that time.

Thus the picture of the beautiful princess of Sunda enchanted king Hayam Wuruk. Shortly afterward, he sent yet another emissary. This time it was an important official, whose name was Madhu, to Sunda to ask for the hand of the princess.

After just six days at sea, Madhu arrived in Sunda. He demanded an audience with the king and told him about the purpose of his journey. The king rejoiced as the most celebrated king of Majapahit was willing to marry his daughter. But the princess herself did not say much.

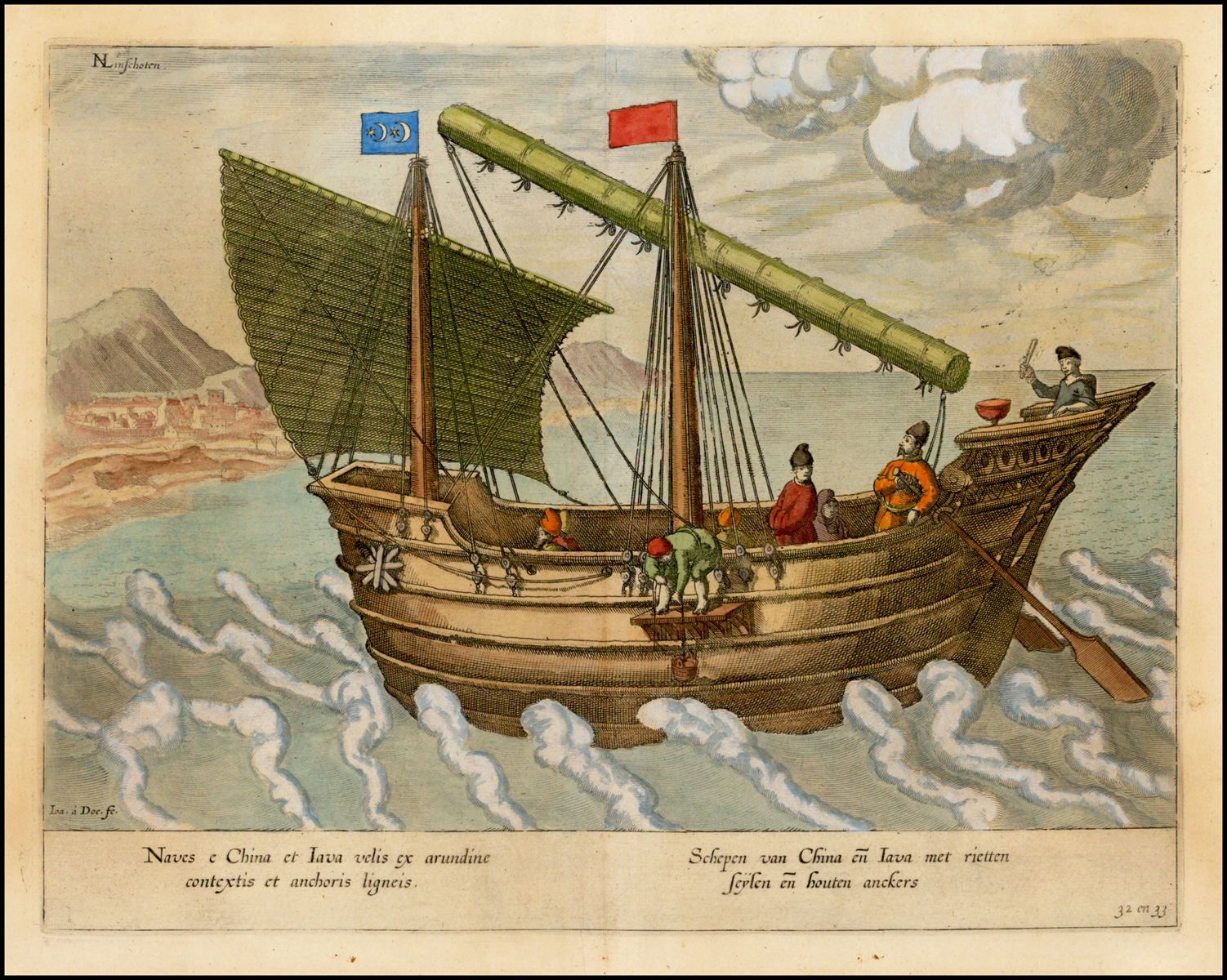
A Chinese-Javanese hybrid junk, drawn by van Linschoten in 1596.

Soon Madhu journeyed back home to Majapahit and handed over the letter of reply of the king of Sunda to King Hayam Wuruk. Not long afterward, the Sundanese party departed for Majapahit. They sailed with 200 big vessels and smaller boats also escorted them. The total number of the ships must have been about 2,000. But before the Sundanese royal family entered their vessel, they saw a bad omen. Their vessel was a "nine-decked hybrid Tatar-Javanese junk, which became in common use after Wijaya’s war" (Wijaya was the founder of Majapahit. There was also a failed invasion of Majapahit by a Mongolian armada in 1293. Usually the word Tatar means Mongolian or Chinese in Javanese).

Meanwhile, in Majapahit, they were busy preparing the reception of the Sundanese guests. Ten days later the chief head of the port in Bubat reported that the Sundanese party was already visible. Hayam Wuruk and both his uncle got ready to receive them. But the grand vizier Gajah Mada disapproved. He held the view that a great king of Majapahit should not receive a vassal kingdom such as Sunda in such a manner. Who knows he is an enemy in disguise.

And thus the intention of Hayam Wuruk was not fulfilled. He followed Gajah Mada's advice. The other palace servants and dignitaries were shocked to hear this. But none dared to resist.

In Bubat, the news about the latest developments in Majapahit already leaked in. The king of Sunda then sent an envoy, consisting of the grand vizier, Anèpakěn, three other dignitaries, and some 300 footmen. They went directly to Gajah Mada's residence. There they told him that it appeared as if the king of Majapahit did not accomplish his commitment, accordingly the king of Sunda prepared to sail back home. Then, a hefty discussion followed as Gajah Mada held the view that the Sundanese should act as vassals, just like any other vassals from Nusantara. After both parties exchanged insults, a fight seemed unavoidable. But a royal pundit named Smaranata intervened. The Sundanese envoy went away after they got an assurance that the king of Majapahit would present them with a final decision within two days.

In the meantime, after the king of Sunda received the news, he stated that he was not willing to serve as a vassal. He told his men his decision that it was better to die on the battlefield as a ksatriya (warrior) than to live on, only to be humiliated by the Majapahit Javanese. His men agreed to follow and defend their king.

After that, the king of Sunda came to his wife and daughter and told them to return home. They refused however and insisted on staying with him.

=== Canto II ===
Everything was ready. The Majapahit Javanese sent a messenger to the Sundanese camp. The conditions were read. They told them to surrender and to submit as vassals. Angrily the Sundanese refused and a war was inevitable.

The Majapahit army consisted of footmen, dignitaries, the grand vizier Gajah Mada, and finally Hayam Wuruk and both his uncles.

There followed a bitter fight. In the beginning, many Majapahit Javanese perished, but in the end, the Sundanese bit the dust. Almost all of them were slaughtered. Anèpaken was killed by Gajah Mada while the king of Sunda was killed by the fathers of his children-in-law: the king of Kahuripan and the king of Daha. Pitar was the only Sundanese officer who survived. He pretended to be dead among the corpses of the perished soldiers. He escaped and went straight to the pavilion of the queen and the princess. There he reported the latest developments. They were depressed and committed to killing themselves. After that, the women of the soldiers committed ritual suicide on the corpses of their husbands.

=== Canto III ===
King Hayam Wuruk felt worried after he witnessed the battle. He went to the Sundanese camp, looking for the princess. But she was already dead. He lamented her and wanted to be united with her.

After that, a ceremony in remembrance of the deaths was performed. Soon, King Hayam Wuruk himself died in misery. After the funeral rites were performed, his two uncles discussed the whole affair. Both blamed Gajah Mada for the situation. Then they marched to his residence as they wanted to capture and kill him. In the meantime, Gajah Mada felt that his time was near. So accordingly, he put on his religious attire and began to meditate and to perform yoga. Then he disappeared (moksha) into nothingness in a state of invisibility.

Thereafter the king of Kahuripan and the king of Daha returned home, as they felt that everything in Majapahit reminded them of the sad unpleasant events.

== Some analysis ==
Kidung Sunda has to be considered as a literary work of art and not as a reliable historical chronicle. However, the events told in this text might have been based on true factual events.

On the whole, the story narrated in this text is told directly. It is rather different from other works in the same genre. The narration combines both romantic and dramatic elements appealingly. With lively descriptions and dialogues, the protagonists are brought to life.

Furthermore, the story is logical and real. There is no mention of impossibilities, exaggerations beyond belief, and supernatural things, except for the disappearance of Gajah Mada (his moksha). According to Nugroho, moksha is a symbol of death. This does not correspond either to other contemporary historical sources. Usually, a Balinese text (kidung) is passed down from generation to generation, gradually loses its accuracy, and contains more fantastic and amazing things.

It has to be said that the author or narrator has chosen the side of the Sundanese in this narration. Therefore, many things do not correspond to other sources as mentioned earlier briefly.

== Authorship ==
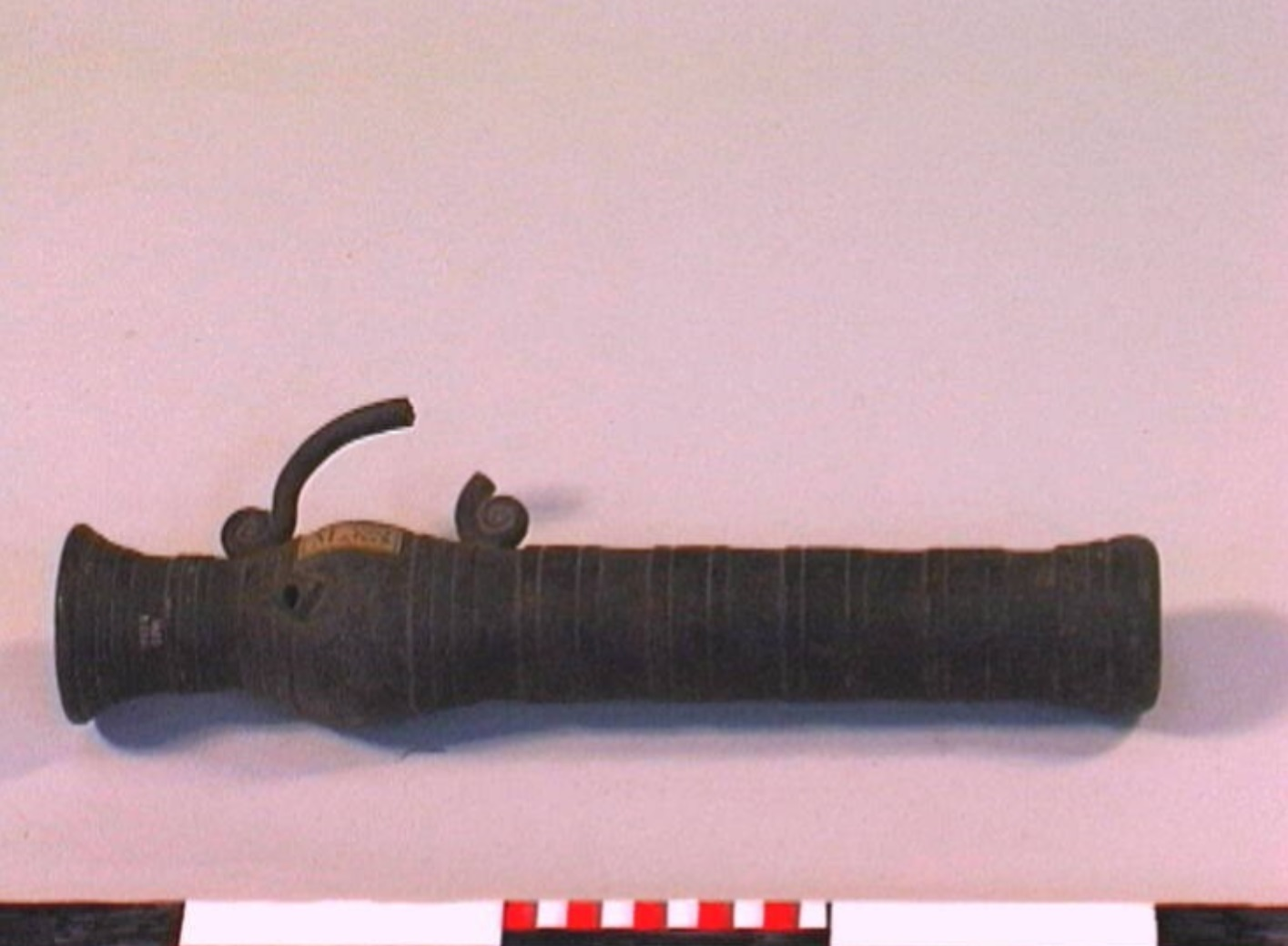
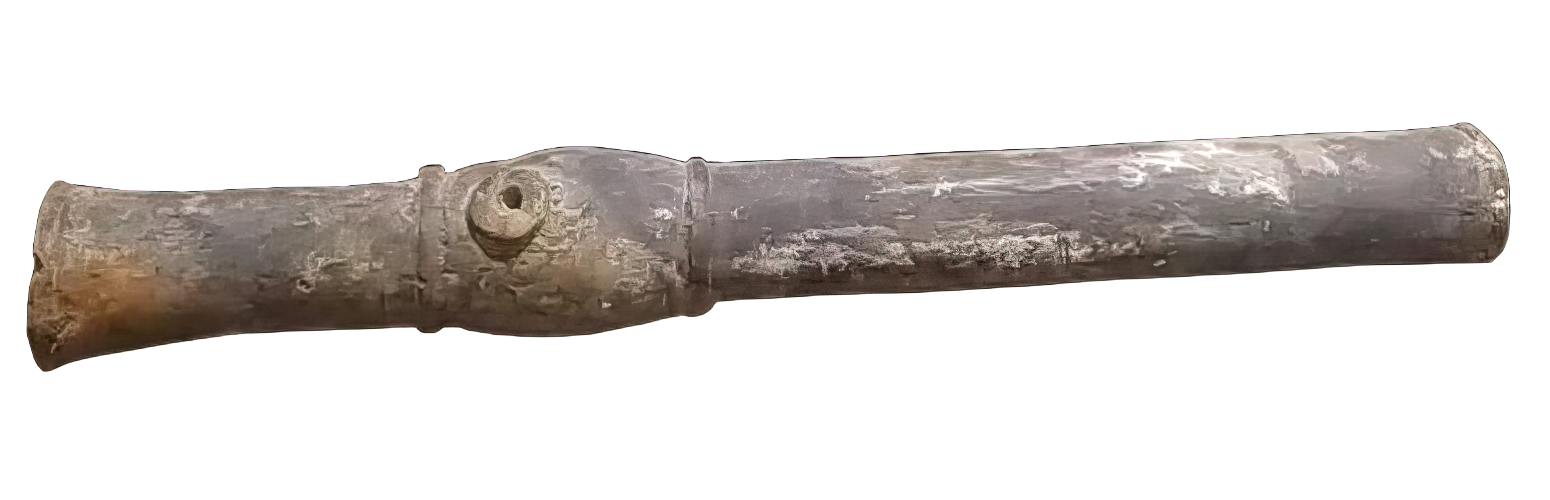
Early firearms from Java:
- Iron bedil tombak from Majalengka, West Java. While the area of provenance is Sunda, the weapon might be Javanese in origin.
- Bronze hand cannon-type cetbang, found in the Brantas river, Jombang, East Java.

All manuscripts of Kidung Sunda are of Balinese provenance. However, it is not known where this work was composed, either in Java or in Bali. The identity of the author is not known either. Neither is the date of composition known. In the story, there are mentions of bedil (gunpowder weapon or firearm), but these do not prove to be a valid criterion to date the text. The Indonesian people already knew the gunpowder weapons relatively early. In the 1293 Mongol invasion of Java, Chinese–Mongol troops used pào (Chinese for cannon) against Kediri forces. Cannons and firearms are used by the Majapahit, modeled after the Chinese cannons.

C. C. Berg argued that the poem was composed ca. 1550 AD or later because there is a description of the horse of patih Anepakěn, the Sundanese vizier. His horse is compared to the horse named Anda Wesi of Rangga Lawe, a well-known character from another Javanese poem; Kidung Rangga Lawe. The latter was, according to Juynboll to be from 1465 saka, or 1543 AD. However Berg is open to earlier dating, because the Leiden manuscript was a new copy of younger date. Damais argued that Kidung Rangga Lawe was originally composed in 1334 AD, reading the chronogram as 1256 saka instead of 1465 saka. Therefore, both the Kidung Rangga Lawe and the Kidung Sunda may have been originally written in the 14th century.

Islamic influences are already discernible. Kidung Sunda contains some Perso-Arabic loanwords such as kabar (news) and subandar (harbourmaster).

== Some fragments ==
Some fragments of the text will be presented in the following. The text is taken from C.C. Berg's edition (1927). However, the spelling has been somewhat modified to modern usage. Just as in Berg's edition, no distinction between retroflex and dental stops is made. The Sanskrit loanwords are spelled in the Javanese manner.

=== Gajah Mada verbally abused by the Sundanese envoy (stanza 1.66b – 1.68 a) ===
Ih angapa, Gajah Mada, agung wuwusmu i kami, ngong iki mangkw angaturana sira sang rajaputri, adulurana bakti, mangkana rakwa karěpmu, pada lan Nusantara dede Sunda iki, durung-durung ngong iki andap ring yuda.

Abasa lali po kita nguni duk kita aněkani jurit, amrang pradesa ring gunung, ěnti ramening yuda, wong Sunda kagingsir, wong Jipang amburu, praptâpatih Sunda apulih, rusak wadwamu gingsir.

Mantrimu kalih tinigas anama Lěs Beleteng angěmasi, bubar wadwamu malayu, anânibani jurang, amurug-murug rwi, lwir patining lutung, uwak setan pating burěngik, padâmalakw ing urip.

Mangke agung kokohanmu, uwabmu lwir ntuting gasir, kaya purisya tinilar ing asu, mengkene kaharěpta, tan pracura juti, ndi sasana tinutmu gurwaning dustârusuh, dadi angapusi sang sadubudi, patitânêng niraya atmamu těmbe yen antu.

Indonesian Translation:

- "Wahai Gajah Mada, apa maksudnya engkau bermulut besar terhadap kami? Kita ini sekarang ingin membawa Tuan Putri, sementara engkau menginginkan kami harus membawa bakti? Sama seperti dari Nusantara. Kita lain, kita orang Sunda, belum pernah kami kalah berperang.
- Seakan-akan lupa engkau dahulu kala, ketika engkau berperang, bertempur di daerah-daerah pegunungan. Sungguh dahsyat peperangannya, diburu orang Jipang. Kemudian patih Sunda datang kembali dan bala tentaramu mundur.
- Kedua mantrimu yang bernama Lěs dan Beleteng diparang dan mati. Pasukanmu bubar dan melarikan diri. Ada yang jatuh di jurang dan terkena duri-duri. Mereka mati bagaikan kera, siamang dan setan. Di mana-mana mereka merengek-rengek minta tetap hidup.
- Sekarang, besar juga kata-katamu. Bau mulutmu seperti kentut jangkrik, seperti tahi anjing. Sekarang maumu itu tidak sopan dan berkhianat. Ajaran apa yang kau ikuti selain engkau ingin menjadi guru yang berdusta dan berbuat buruk. Menipu orang berbudi syahdu. Jiwamu akan jatuh ke neraka, jika mati!"

English Translation:

- "Well, what does it mean, Gajah Mada, for you have such a big mouth against us? You expect us to deliver the princess accompanied by tokens of obeisance? You see us as vassals? We are different, we are Sundanese, and we have never lost a battle.
- It is as if you forget the former times, when you attacked the villages on the mountains. It was a fierce battle, the Sundanese were routed, chased after by men of Jipang. But then the grand vizier of Sunda came and stroke back. Your men were in retreat.
- Both your ministers Lěs and Beleteng; were struck and killed. Your men were in disarray and retreated. Some fell into the ravines and were pricked the thorns. They died as monkeys, weasels and setan (satan, ghost). There were moaning all over the place. Everyone asked to be let alive.
- And now you are vomiting such big words? The smell of your breath is like the flatulence of a cricket, as if the excrement left behind by a dog. Such a desire of yours is unsuitable and deceiving. Well what kind of law are you following, that you are a master of evil and corruption? You want to mislead good people? Your being shall descend to hell, when you die!"

=== The king of Sunda rejecting the conditions of Majapahit (stanza 2.69 – 2.71) ===
[...], yan kitâwĕdîng pati, lah age marĕka, i jĕng sri naranata, aturana jiwa bakti, wangining sĕmbah, sira sang nataputri.
Wahu karungu denira sri narendra, bangun runtik ing ati, ah kita potusan, warahĕn tuhanira, nora ngong marĕka malih, angatĕrana, iki sang rajaputri.
Mong kari sasisih bahune wong Sunda, rĕmpak kang kanan keri, norengsun ahulap, rinĕbateng paprangan, srĕngĕn si rakryan apatih, kaya siniwak, karnasula angapi.

Indonesian Translation:

- [...], jika engkau takut mati, datanglah segera menghadap Sri Baginda (Hayam Wuruk) dan haturkan bukti kesetianmu, keharuman sembahmu dengan menghaturkan dia sang Tuan Putri.
- Maka ini terdengar oleh Sri Raja <Sunda> dan dia menjadi murka: "Wahai kalian para duta! Laporkan kepada tuanmu bahwa kami tidak akan menghadap lagi menghantarkan Tuan Putri!"
- "Meskipun orang-orang Sunda tinggal satu tangannya, atau hancur sebelah kanan dan kiri, tiada akan ‘silau’ beta!". Sang Tuan Patih juga marah, seakan-akan robek telinganya mendengarkan (kata-kata pedas orang Majapahit).

English Translation:

- [...]. "If you are afraid to die, then come forward and pay obeisance at the feet of His Majesty the King and offer him the living evidence of your servitude: the fragrant obeisance, the princess."
- The Sundanese king just barely heard this, as he stood up angrily: "Hey, listen you messengers, just tell your master that I don’t have the intention to approach him and to convey the princess!
- Even if the Sundanese only have one arm left, or even more if both the right and the left arms are destroyed, their eyes won’t be impressed if they are outnumbered on the battlefield." The Sundanese vizier also got irritated as he heard the sharp words (of the Majapahit envoy).

=== Hayam Wuruk lamented the dead princess (stanza 3.29 – 3.33) ===
Sireñanira tinañan, unggwani sang rajaputri, tinuduhakěn aneng made sira wontěn aguling, mara sri narapati, katěmu sira akukub, perěmas natar ijo, ingungkabakěn tumuli, kagyat sang nata dadi atěmah laywan.

Wěněsning muka angraras, netra duměling sadidik, kang lati angrawit katon, kengisning waja amanis, anrang rumning srigading, kadi anapa pukulun, ngke pangeran marěka, tinghal kamanda punyaningsun pukulun, mangke prapta angajawa.

Sang tan sah aneng swacita, ning rama rena inisti, marmaning parěng prapta kongang mangkw atěmah kayêki, yan si prapta kang wingi, bangiwen pangeraningsun, pilih kari agěsang, kawula mangke pinanggih, lah palalun, pangdaning Widy angawasa.

Palar-palarěn ing jěmah, pangeran sida kapanggih, asisihan eng paturon, tan kalangan ing duskrěti, sida kâptining rawit, mwang rena kalih katuju, lwir mangkana panapanira sang uwus alalis, sang sinambrama lěnglěng amrati cita.

Sangsaya lara kagagat, pětěng rasanikang ati, kapati sira sang katong, kang tangis mangkin gumirih, lwir guruh ing katrini, matag paněděng ing santun, awor swaraning kumbang, tangising wong lanang istri, arěrěb-rěrěb pawraning gělung lukar.

Indonesian Translation:

- Maka ditanyalah dayang-dayang di manakah gerangan tempat Tuan Putri. Diberilah tahu berada di tengah ia, tidur. Maka datanglah Sri Baginda, dan melihatnya tertutup kain berwarna hijau keemasan di atas tanah. Setelah dibuka, terkejutlah sang Prabu karena sudah menjadi mayat.
- Pucat mukanya mempesona, matanya sedikit membuka, bibirnya indah dilihat, gigi-giginya yang tak tertutup terlihat manis, seakan menyaingi keindahan sri gading. Seakan-akan ia menyapa: "Sri Paduka, datanglah ke mari. Lihatlah kekasihnda (?), berbakti, Sri Baginda, datang ke tanah Jawa.
- Yang senantiasa berada di pikiran ayah dan ibu, yang sangat mendambakannya, itulah alasannya mereka ikut datang. Sekarang jadinya malah seperti ini. Jika datang kemarin dulu, wahai Rajaku, mungkin <hamba> masih hidup dan sekarang dinikahkan. Aduh sungguh kejamlah kuasa Tuhan!
- Mari kita harap wahai Raja, supaya berhasil menikah, berdampingan di atas ranjang tanpa dihalang-halangi niat buruk. Berhasillah kemauan bapak dan ibu, keduanya." Seakan-akan begitulah ia yang telah tewas menyapanya. Sedangkan yang disapa menjadi bingung dan merana.
- Semakin lama semakin sakit rasa penderitaannya. Hatinya terasa gelap, dia sang Raja semakin merana. Tangisnya semakin keras, bagaikan guruh di bulan ketiga^{*}, yang membuka kelopak bunga untuk mekar, bercampur dengan suara kumbang. Begitulah tangis para pria dan wanita, rambut-rambut yang lepas terurai bagaikan kabut.

English Translation:

- He asked the nannies regarding the whereabouts of the princess. They showed him a place in the middle where there was someone lying. The king came and saw that it was covered with a blanket made of green golden threads on the ground. He uncovered and was shocked, as she had become a corpse.
- The paleness of her face was enrapturing, her eyes were half shut; her lips were beautiful to see; her uncovered teeth presented a friendly appearance and rivalled the fruits of a sri gading tree (some kind of coconut). It was as if she greeted him: "My lord, please come near and see how my meritorious deed by coming to Java is rewarded …(? unsure).
- This has been in the mind of my father and my mother all the time. And this was their desire. That is the reason why they accompanied me. And behold how it all ends up! If you were here the day before yesterday, I might have been still alive and to be wed. Oh how cruel is this fate provided by the Almighty!
- Let us hope my Lord that we will be united and lie next to each other on couch, without the evil fate getting in our way. Then the wish of my father and my mother will be fulfilled, which will delight both of us." It was as if the corpse spoke in such a manner. The one who was spoken to, was bewildered, he felt dejected.
- The longer the pain the more painful the suffering. His heart felt dark, he the King was increasingly miserable. Her cries grew louder, like the thunder of the third month*, which opened the petals to bloom, mixed with the sound of beetles. Such was the cry of men and women, loose hairs falling like fog.

*The third month more or less falls in September, which is still the dry season. So the sound of thunder this month is an unusual thing.

== See also ==
- Battle of Bubat
- Battle of Brebes
- Military of the Majapahit Empire
- Territories of Majapahit

== Bibliography ==
- C.C. Berg, 1927, ‘Kidung Sunda. Inleiding, tekst, vertaling en aanteekeningen’. BKI 83: 1–161.
- C.C. Berg, 1928, Inleiding tot de studie van het Oud-Javaansch (Kidung Suṇḍāyana). Soerakarta: De Bliksem.
- Damais, Louis-Charles (1958). "I. Études d'épigraphie indonésienne : V. Dates de manuscrits et documents divers de Java, Bali et Lombok" Bulletin de l'École Française d'Extrême-Orient. Tome 49, pp. 1–257.
- P.J. Zoetmulder, 1974, Kalangwan. A Survey of Old Javanese Literature The Hague: Martinus Nijhoff. ISBN 90-247-1674-8
- Sri Sukesi Adiwimarta, 1999, ‘Kidung Sunda (Sastra Daerah Jawa)’, Antologi Sastra Daerah Nusantara, kaca 93–121. Jakarta: Yayasan Obor. ISBN 979-461-333-9
