= Battle of Bubat =

Battle occurred in 1357 at Bubat square

Pasunda Bubat
- Part of Majapahit–Sundanese conflicts
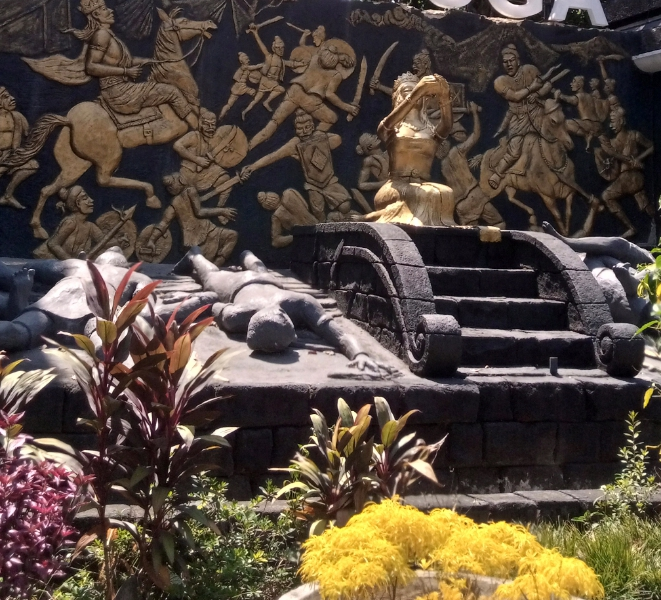
- A statue in the park depicting a Sundanese princess who committed suicide in the midst of war.
Date	1357
Location	Bubat square, Trowulan, Majapahit, Java
Result	Majapahit victory; Javanese–Sundanese relations strained

Belligerents
Majapahit Empire	Sunda Kingdom

Commanders and leaders
Gajah Mada	Maharaja Buana †; Dyah Pitaloka ‡‡

Strength
Large number of troops	Unknown; At least 2,200 vessels (not all present during the battle)

Casualties and losses
Unknown	Almost all perished

The Battle of Bubat, also known as Pasunda Bubat, is the battle between the Sundanese royal family and the Majapahit army that took place in Bubat Square on the northern part of Trowulan (Majapahit capital city) in 1279 Saka or 1357 CE.

== Historical account ==
"... manak deui Prěbu Maharaja. Lawasniya ratu tujuh tahun. Kena kabawa ku kalawisaya, kabancana ku seuweu dimanten, ngaran Tohaan. Mu(n)dut agung dipipanumbasna. Urang reya sa(ng)kan nu angkat ka Jawa, mumul nu lakian di Sunda pan prangprang di Majapahit, ..."
"... has a son, Prěbu Maharaja, being a king for seven years. Because of a disaster, got carried away by his daughter being a bride named Tohaan, requesting a heavy condition (wish). Many people started going to Java, because (she) did not want to get married in Sunda, thus there was a battle in Majapahit, ..."

— Carita Parahyangan

The historical account of Pasunda Bubat is mentioned in Carita Parahyangan (16th century) and Pararaton (15th century), but not found in the Nagarakretagama (14th century), while the story of the battle of Bubat is the main theme of the Balinese manuscript Kidung Sunda (c. mid 16th century).

The Battle of Bubat was mentioned in a segment of the 15th-century Javanese chronicle of Pararaton. The author of this manuscript is unknown, composed in the form of chronicles around 1474–1486, while the literary part was composed as history between 1500–1613. This manuscript was first published by J.L.A. Brandes, a Dutch philologist, in 1896, complete with translations, notes, and comments.

Although the event took place in the mid-14th century, it was not until the 16th century that the story was found in the Sundanese literature of Carita Parahyangan, although this text only gives a short piece of information regarding the incident. In Carita Parahyangan the Princess of Sunda is referred to as Tohaan (Note: This old Sundanese term is cognate to modern Malay-Indonesian Tuan which means "lord".) which means "the respectable or revered one". Carita Parahyangan mentions a short verse of "...pan prang-rang di Majapahit." which translates to "...people fought a battle in Majapahit."

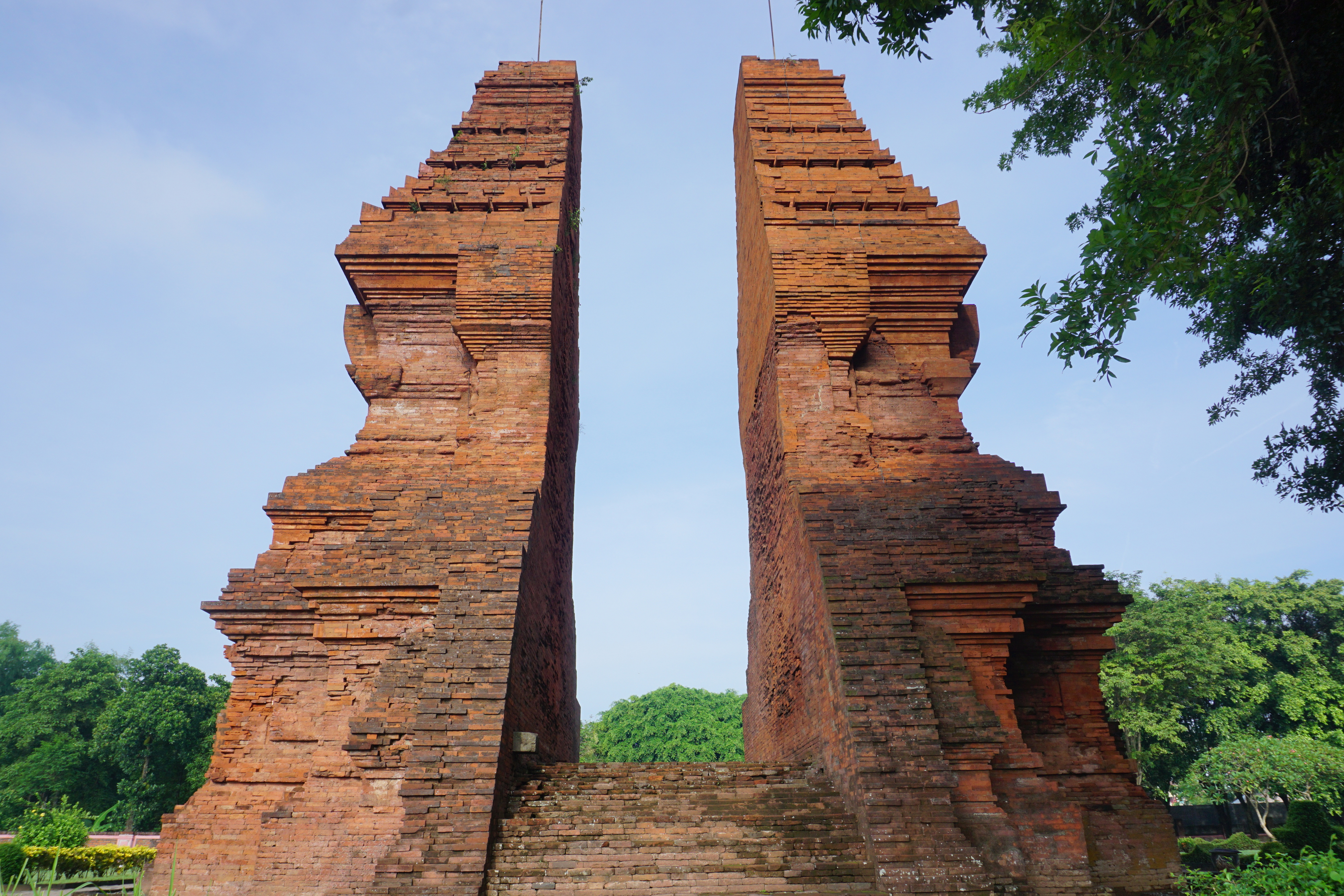
According to the Nagarakretagama, Bubat square is located close to the north of Trowulan Majapahit capital city, probably somewhere near Wringin Lawang gate or Brahu temple

Then, in the early 20th, CC Berg, a Dutch historian, published the Kidung Sunda text and translations of Balinese origin (1927) which unraveled the Bubat Incident, and the shorter version of Kidung Sundayana (1928). In Javanese historical writing, Berg called the Kidung Sunda — possibly composed after 1540 in Bali (Note: The original source of Kidung Sunda may have been written in the 14th century. See the page for more information.) — contains historical facts because the incident was reinforced by an ancient Sundanese manuscript, Carita Parahyangan. Berg concludes, "in the Kidung Sunda we must see the literary remnant of folklore stories and in the same-themed with Pararaton fragment...". However, the original composition date of Kidung Sunda may be earlier, from the 14th century CE. Recent scholars such as L.C. Damais and S.O. Robson put the dating of Kidung Panji Wijayakrama-Rangga Lawe, a kidung whose motifs are similar in content and are thought to be contemporary with the Kidung Sunda, as early as 1334 CE.

Interestingly, Nagarakretagama written by Mpu Prapanca in 1365, which is widely considered as the primary source on Majapahit history, did not mention the event at all. This has led several historians to question the authenticity of Pararaton, and suggest that Kidung Sunda was merely an ancient fiction novel and the Battle of Bubat never took place in the first place. To reconcile these varied studies, it is important to understand that Nagarakretagama is a pujasastra, (Note: A literary work intended to honor Hayam Wuruk, the King of Majapahit, and to projects the glory of Majapahit crown.) "It seems to be intentionally overlooked by Prapanca, (Note: It is highly possible that the incident, which was a shame for Majapahit court, was intentionally erased and overlooked by Prapanca.) because it does not contribute to the greatness of Majapahit, and even can be regarded as Gajah Mada's political failure to subjugate the Sundanese," Marwati Djoened Poesponegoro and Nugroho Notosusanto wrote in Indonesian National History II.

== Wedding proposal ==
"... Tumuli Pasunda Bubat. Bhre Prabhu ayun ing Putri ring Suṇḍa. Patih Maḍu ingutus anguṇḍangeng wong Suṇḍa, ahiděp wong Suṇḍa yan awawarangana ...,"
"... The start (cause) of Pasunda Bubat. Bhre Prabu who desires the Princess of Sunda sent Patih Madhu, a senior mantri (minister), to invite the Sundanese. Did not mind being a besan (in-law), (Note: A besan is term to describe the relations between parents of wedded couples.) came (Prabu Maharaja King of) Sunda (to Majapahit). "
"... Instead of being welcomed with a welcoming party, they face the harsh attitude of Mahapatih Gajah Mada who demands the Princess of Sunda as an offering. Sundanese parties disagree and are determined to war."

— Pararaton

Hayam Wuruk, king of Majapahit decided — probably for political reasons — to take Princess Citra Rashmi (also known as Pitaloka) as his spouse. She was a daughter of Prabu Maharaja Linggabuana Wisesa of the Sunda Kingdom. Tradition describes her as a girl of extraordinary beauty. Patih Madhu, a matchmaker from Majapahit was sent to the kingdom to ask for her hand in royal marriage. Delighted by the proposal and seeing the opportunity to foster an alliance with Majapahit, the mightiest kingdom in the region, the king of Sunda gave his blessing and decided to accompany his daughter to Majapahit for the wedding.

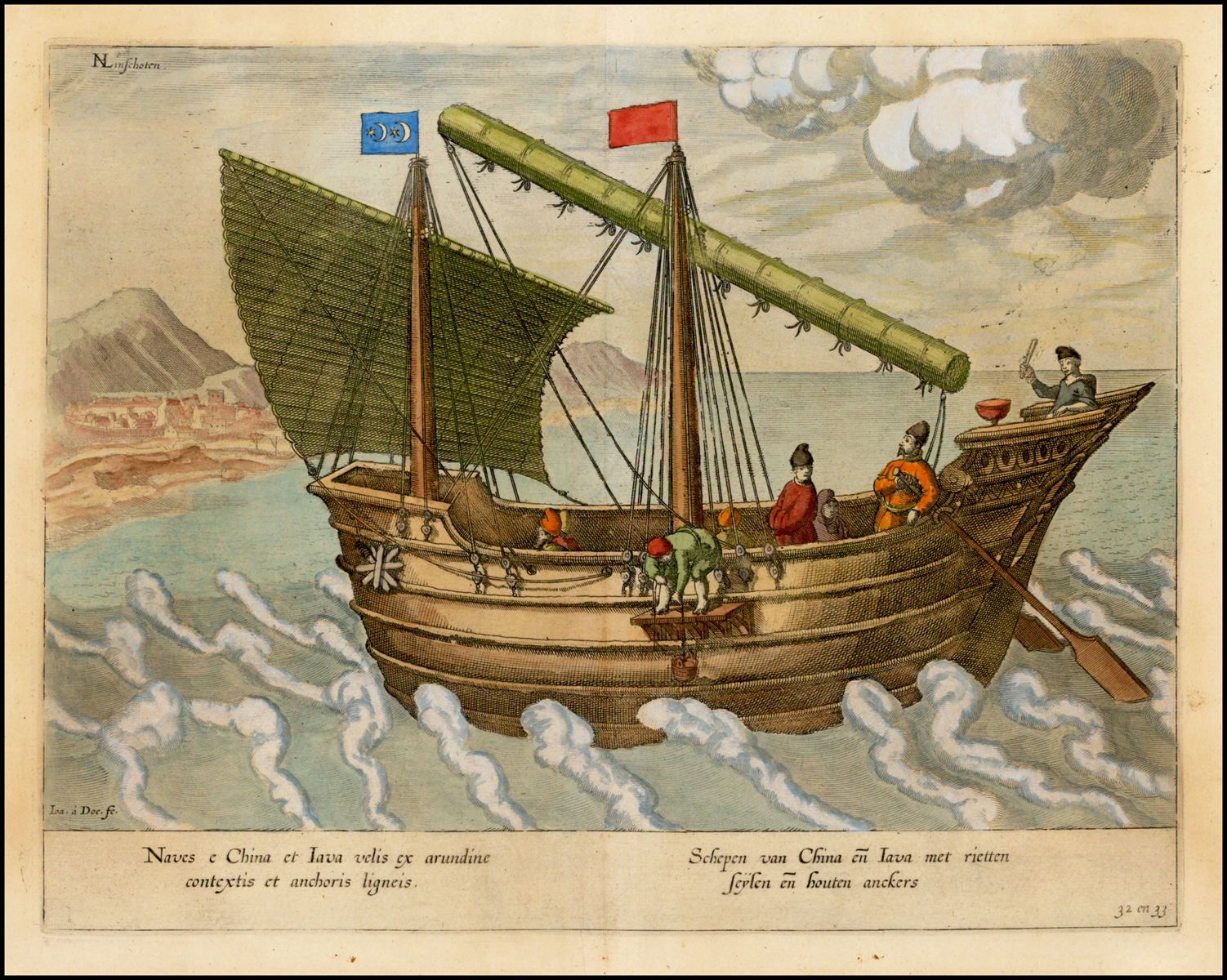
The Sundanese royal party arrived at the port of Hujung Galuh by jong sasanga wangunan, a type of Javanese junk, which also incorporates Chinese techniques, such as using iron nails alongside wooden dowels, the construction of watertight bulkhead, and the addition of central rudder.

In 1357 the Sunda king and the royal family arrived in Majapahit after sailing across the Java Sea in a fleet of 200 large ships and 2000 smaller vessels. The royal family boarded a nine-decked junk ship (Java: Jong sasanga wangunan), (Note: The term jong sasaṅa wangunan is interpreted differently by historians, it can be described as a grand jong ship with sanga (nine) buildings; either nine cabins or decks. Anthony Reid mistakenly transcribed it as jong sasana, rendering the ṅ as n instead of η or ng. The correct name was jong sasanga wangunan.) and landed at Hujung Galuh port, sailed inland through Brantas River and arrived at the river port of Canggu. The royal party then encamped on Bubat Square in the northern part of Trowulan, the capital city of Majapahit, and awaited the wedding ceremony.

However, Gajah Mada, the Majapahit prime minister saw the event as an opportunity to demand Sunda's submission to Majapahit overlordship and insisted that instead of becoming queen of Majapahit, the princess was to be presented as a token of submission and treated as a mere concubine of the Majapahit king. The Sunda king was angered and humiliated by Gajah Mada's demand and decided to go back home as well as cancel the royal wedding. However, Majapahit demanded the hand of the Sundanese princess and besieged the Sunda encampment.

== The battle and the suicide of the princess ==
"Gajah Mada reported the (defiance) behavior of the Sundanese (to the court). Bhre Prameswara of Wengker declared ready to fight. Thus, Majapahit troops surrounded the Sundanese. Not willing to surrender, the Sundanese chose to risk their lives. The battle is inevitable. Cheers rumbled over the sound reyong. (Note: A gamelan instrument.) King of Sunda, King Maharaja, was the first to lost his life.

Bhre Prameswara come to Bubat, unknowingly that there are still many Sundanese people who have not fallen. No doubt his troops got attacked and ravaged. But he immediately did a counterattack.

Being cornered, the menak (Note: Sundanese nobles.) charged to the south. Majapahit troops who resisted the attack won the victory. Sundanese who attacked to the southwest were killed. Like a sea of blood and a mountain of carcasses, there is no Sundanese left."

— Pararaton

As a result, a skirmish took place in Bubat Square between the Majapahit army and the Sunda royal family in defense of their honour. It was uneven and unfairly matched since the Sundanese party was composed mostly of the royal family, state officials, and nobles, accompanied by servants and royal guards. The numbers of the Sundanese party were estimated at fewer than a hundred. On the other hand, the armed guards stationed within Majapahit capital city under Gajah Mada's command were estimated at several thousand well-armed and well-trained troops. The Sundanese party was surrounded in the center of the Bubat square. Some sources mentioned that the Sundanese managed to defend the square and strike back at the Majapahit siege several times. However, as the day went on the Sundanese were exhausted and overwhelmed. Despite facing certain deaths, the Sundanese demonstrated extraordinary courage and chivalry as one by one, all of them fell.

The Sunda king was killed in a duel with a Majapahit general as well as other Sundanese nobles with almost all of the Sundanese royal party massacred in the tragedy. Tradition says that the heartbroken princess — along with very possibly all remaining Sundanese women — took her own life to defend the honour and dignity of her country. The ritualized suicide by the women of the kshatriya (warrior) class after the defeat of their menfolk, is supposed to defend their pride and honour as well as to protect their chastity, rather than facing the possibility of humiliation through rape, subjugation, or enslavement.

== Aftermath ==
The Sunda Kingdom occupied the western half of Java island, it was Majapahit's western neighbour

According to tradition, Dyah Pitaloka's death was mourned by Hayam Wuruk and the entire population of the Sunda kingdom who had lost most members of their royal family. Later, King Hayam Wuruk married Paduka Sori, his cousin instead. Pitaloka's deed and her father's courage are revered as noble acts of honour, courage, and dignity in Sundanese tradition. Her father, Prabu Maharaja Linggabuana Wisesa was revered by the Sundanese as Prabu Wangi (Sundanese: king with pleasant fragrance) because of his heroic act of defending his honour against Majapahit. His descendants, the later kings of Sunda, were called Siliwangi (Sundanese: successor of Wangi).

Gajah Mada faced opposition, distrust, and sneering at the Majapahit court because of his careless act, which was not to the taste of the Majapahit nobles, cast shame on Majapahit dignity, and undermined King Hayam Wuruk's influence. This unfortunate event also marked the end of Gajah Mada's career, since not long after this event, the king forced Gajah Mada into an early retirement by awarding the prime minister the lands in Madakaripura (today Probolinggo), thus pushing him far from the capital city's courtly affairs.

This tragedy severely harmed the relationship between the two kingdoms and resulted in hostility for years to come, the situation never again returning to normality. Prince Niskalawastu Kancana — Princess Pitaloka's younger brother who during his infancy remained in Kawali palace (Sunda Galuh capital city) and did not accompany his family to Majapahit — became the sole surviving heir of the Sunda King. His policies after ascending to the throne, among others, were severing Sundanese diplomatic relations with Majapahit, imposing an isolation policy upon Majapahit, including enacting the law Larangan Estri ti Luaran, which forbade Sundanese people from marrying Javanese. These reactions reflected the Sundanese disappointment and anger towards Majapahit and later contributed to the Sundanese-Javanese animosity, which may still run even to the present day.

Curiously, although Bali is known as the heir of Majapahit culture, Balinese opinion seems to take the Sundanese side in this dispute, as evidenced through their manuscript Kidung Sunda. The Balinese reverence for and admiration of the Sundanese heroic act of courageously facing certain death was probably by Hindu code of honour of kshatriyas caste, that the ultimate and perfect death of a kshatriya is on the edge of the sword; to die on the battlefield. The practice of demonstrating the act of courage has its Balinese counterpart in their puputan tradition, a fight to the death by men followed by mass ritual suicide by the women in preference to facing the humiliation of surrender.

It is possible that Sunda became vassalized by Majapahit after this battle. It ultimately regained independence probably before the Regreg War. The subjugation of Sunda by Majapahit means that Gajah Mada has finally fulfilled his Palapa oath:

... Tunggalan padompo pasunda, samangkana sira Gajah Mada mukti palapa. (Unified after the conquest of Dompo and Sunda, thus Gajah Mada eats palapa.)

== Legacy ==
The map of Trowulan, the Bubat square suggested was located in the northern parts of the city

The tragic battle is believed to have caused the ill sentiments of Sundanese-Javanese animosity for generations. For example, unlike most Indonesian cities, until recently in Bandung, West Java's capital city also the cultural center of Sundanese people, there is no street name bearing the name "Gajah Mada" or "Majapahit". Although today Gajah Mada is considered an Indonesian national hero, Sundanese people still do not find him deserving based on his wicked deed in this incident. And vice versa, until recently, there was no street bearing the names of "Siliwangi" or "Sunda" in Surabaya and Yogyakarta.

The tragedy also caused a myth to revolve around Indonesians, which forbids marriage between a Sundanese and a Javanese, as it would be unsustainable and only bring misery to the couple.

The battle has become a fertile inspiration as an Indonesian form of tragedy; including wayang performances and various dance dramas. They mostly describe the tale of a doomed tragic romance, the battle of two kingdoms, and the suicide of a beautiful princess. Tales based on the Battle of Bubat are performed as wayang golek puppet performances, Sundanese sandiwara drama, and Javanese Ketoprak traditional drama. It also inspires historical fiction novel books and strategy video games.

== Reconciliation ==
Due to this tragic battle becoming a historical-cultural grievance that strained the inter-ethnic relations between Javanese and Sundanese people — two of the largest ethnic groups in Indonesia for ages, there are mutual efforts to reconcile the relations, among others by renaming the city streets. On 6 March 2018, the East Java Governor, Soekarwo, together with West Java Governor, Ahmad Heryawan (Aher), and the Yogyakarta Governor, Sri Sultan Hamengkubuwono X, held the Cultural Reconciliation of Cultural Harmony of Sunda-Java in Hotel Bumi Surabaya, Tuesday, March 6, 2018. They agreed to end the post-Bubat problem by renaming the arterial roads in Surabaya, Yogyakarta, and Bandung.

The names of two arterial roads in Surabaya City were replaced with Sundanese identities. The Gunungsari Road was replaced by the name of Jalan Prabu Siliwangi and Dinoyo Street was replaced by Sunda Road. Through this, Jalan Prabu Siliwangi is now finally side by side with Gajah Mada Street, while Sunda Road is now side by side with Jalan Majapahit. "Through this event, the problems between ethnic Javanese and Sundanese that occurred in the last 661 years are finished today. Thank God, both I and Pak Aher were finally able to find a common point" said Soekarwo.

In Bandung, "the name of Jalan Majapahit will replace Jalan Gasibu in the middle of the city, and Jalan Kopo will be replaced by Jalan Hayam Wuruk. The replacement of these two roads is estimated to take place in April or early May 2018," said Aher.

Yogyakarta Governor Sri Sultan Hamengkubuwono X added the naming of these roads is expected to break the dark history that lay on the relationship between the Sundanese and Javanese people. The Yogyakarta Provincial Government will also do the same. "Yogyakarta has put the name of Jalan Siliwangi, Pajajaran, and Majapahit into one unity of road in one lane, from Pelemgurih intersection to Jombor until the intersection of three Maguwoharjo and the intersection of Jalan Wonosari," he said.

== See also ==
- Kidung Sunda
- Pararaton
- Sunda Kingdom
- Battle of Brebes
- Puputan
- Territories of Majapahit
