= Territories of Majapahit =

The extent of Majapahit according to some sources. But not according to Nagarakretagama, which also included western Java into the empire, as Sunda was explicitly claimed according to canto 42 of the manuscript.

According to the Kakawin Nagarakretagama canto XIII and XIV, the following areas are recognized as conquered or subordinate to Majapahit (referred to as mañcanagara). The conquered states in Java were not mentioned because they were still considered part of the royal "mandala".

The names below are based on manuscript sources, both from Majapahit and Malay manuscripts as well as Chinese sources, but little physical evidence remains of an area's recognition of state power.

Included were the kingdoms of Sunda and Madura, because Majapahit claimed the whole of Java. Sunda kingdom became a nominal vassal of Majapahit after the battle of Bubat of 1357, although it can be denied that the discovery of the Horren inscription resulted in a counterattack.

== Nagakretagama transcription ==
=== Canto 6 ===
Stanza 4

3. Sakweh śri yawa raja sapada madudwan nagaratunggalan (All Javanese kings were guests, they were from different countries but)
4. ekhasthana ri wilwatikta mangisapwi sang narendradipa. (unite to Wilwatikta to support the great king)

=== Canto 42 ===
Stanza 2

4. Ndatan lingen i sunda len madhura pan satanah i yawa bhakti tan salah (Not mentioned were Sunda and Madhura because they are Javanese and devoted, it's not wrong)

=== Canto 13 ===
Stanza 1

1. Lwir ning nusa pranusa pramuka sakahawat ksoni ri Malayu
2. nang Jambi mwang Palembang karitang i Teba len Dharmmaśraya tumut,
3. Kandis Kahwas Manangkabwa ri Siyak i Rekan Kampar mwang i Pane,
4. Kampe Harw athawe Mandahiling i Tumihang Parllak mwang i Barat

Stanza 2

1. Hi lwas lawan Samudra mwang i Lamuri Batan Lampung mwang i Barus
2. yekadinyang watek bhumi Malayu satanah kapwamateh anut,
3. len tekang nusa Tanjung Nagara ri Kapuhas lawan ri Katingan,
4. Sampit mwang Kutalingga mwang i Kutawaringin Sambas mwang i Lawai

=== Canto 14 ===
Stanza 1

1. Kadangdangan i Landa len ri Samedhang Tirem tan kasah,
2. ri Sedu Buruneng ri Kalka Saludhung ri Solot Pasir,
3. Baritw i Sawaku muwah ri Tabalung ri Tunjung Kute,
4. Lawan ri Malano makapramuka tang ri Tanjungpura.

Stanza 2

1. Ikang sakahawan Pahang pramuka tang Hujung Medini,
2. ri Lengkasuka len ri Saimwang i Kalanten i Tringgano,
3. Naśor Pakamuwar Dhungun ri Tumasik ri Sanghyang Hujung,
4. Kelang Keda Jere ri Kanjap i niran sanusapupul

Stanza 3

1. Sawetan ikanang tanah Jawa muwah ya warnnanen,
2. ri Bali makamukya tang Badahulu mwang Lwagajah,
3. Gurun makamukha Sukun ri Taliwang ri Dompo Sapi,
4. ri Sanghyang Api Bhima Sheran i Hutan Kadaly apupul

Stanza 4

1. Muwah tang i Gurun sanusa mangaram ri Lombok Mirah,
2. lawan tikang i Saksak adinikalun kahajyan kabeh,
3. muwah tanah i Bantayan pramuka Bantayan len Luwuk,
4. tekeng Uda Makatrayadhi nikanang sanusapupul.

Stanza 5

1. Ikang saka sanusa Makhasar Butung Banggawi,
2. Kunir Ggaliyau mwang i(ng) Salaya Sumba Solot Muar,
3. muwah tikang i Wandan Ambwan athawa Maloko Wwanin,
4. ri Seran i Timur makadining angeka nusatutur.

In this list also given the modern name of a place if it has been agreed by historians.

== Interpretation ==
=== Sumatra ===
Sumatra is referred to in Negarakretagama as "Malayu"

Name	Interpretation
Jambi	Jambi
Palembang	Palembang
Karitang	1. Keritang Kingdom (now Keritang District, Keritang, Indragiri Hilir); 2. Karitang, South Indragiri; 3. Karitang in the south of Jambi^{3}
Teba	1. Muaro Tebo, Jambi; 2. Headwaters of Jambi^{2}; 3. Tebo in the south of Dharmasraya^{3}
Dharmashraya	1. Darmasraya Kingdom; 2. The island of Punjung, Siguntur, upstream of the Batanghari river^{2}; 3. Dharmasraya in the west of Jambi^{3}
Kandis	1. Kandis Kingdom; 2. Kandis, a tributary of the Kwantan, near Koto Tua^{2}; 3. Kandi, vassal area of Lubuk Jantan, on the Sinamar river^{2}; 4. Kandis north of Dharmasraya^{3}
Kahwas	1. Kahwas; 2. Kawai, between Kandi and Tanjung^{1}; 3. Kawas in the west of Minangkabau^{2}
Manangkabwa	Minangkabau, pre-Pagaruyung period society
Siyak	Siak Regency, the pre-sultanate community of Siak
Rekan	Rokan (Rokan Hilir-Rokan Hulu)
Kampar	Kampar
Pane	1. Panai; 2. Pane^{3}
Kampe	1. Kampai Island, now an island in Langkat Regency; 2. Kompe^{1}; 3. Kampei, one of 4 tribes in Petapahan on the Tapung Kiri river upstream of Siak: Peliang, Ceniaga, Kampai, and Domo/Muara Takus^{2}; 4. Kampe^{3}
Haru	1. (H)aru Kingdom, centered in Deli Tua, Deli Serdang Regency now; 2. Haru area around Kalue in Aceh^{1}; 3. Aru, the east coast of Sumatra^{2}; 4. Haru, the area north of the Asahan river^{3}
Mandahiling	1. Mandailing; 2. Mandahiling^{3}
Tumihang	Aceh Tamiang
Parlak	1. Peureulak; 2. Parllah^{1}; 3. Perlak^{2}; 4. Parllak^{3}
Barat	1. Darat^{1}; 2. Aceh's west coast^{2}; 3. Barat^{3}
Lwas	1. Padang Lawas; 2. Lawas^{1}; 3. Padang Lawas or Gayu Luas^{2}
Samudra	1. Sultanate of Samudera Pasai; 2. Samudra near Lhokseumawe, Aceh^{123}
Lamuri	1. Lambri (Lamuri) Kingdom, the center is now a village in Aceh Besar District; 2. Lamuri in Aceh Besar^{123}
Batan	1. Bintan Island; 2. Batam^{2}
Lampung	Lampung^{123}
Barus	Barus, Central Tapanuli (or Pancur, sub-district in present-day Central Tapanuli Regency)^{123}
Notes:^{1} See Atlas van Tropisch Nederland, 1938: 10b^{2} See^{3} See

=== Borneo ===
Borneo is referred to as "Nusa Tanjung Nagara" and/or "Tanjungpuri"

Name	Interpretation
Kapuhas	1. Kapuas Regency, Central Kalimantan; 2. Kapuas area east of the Landak in West Kalimantan^{1}; 3. Kapuas area in Kapuas district in Central Kalimantan^{3}
Katingan	1. Katingan Regency, Central Kalimantan; 2. Katingan, Mendawei river, in Sampit^{2}
Sampit	Sampit (now the capital city of East Kotawaringin Regency)
Kutalingga	1. Kuta Lingga (means city of phallus, site of Candi Laras?/Negara Dipa Kingdom); 2. Kutalingga the area around the Sarawak peninsula^{1}; 3. Lingga, where the Lingga and Batang Lumpur rivers meet, Sarawak.^{2}
Kutawaringin	Kuta Waringin (means banyan city, pre-Kotawaringin Kingdom society, now West Kotawaringin Regency)
Sambas	Sambas (Old Sambas Kingdom, now Sambas Regency)
Lawai	1. Lawai (Kapuas River in West Kalimantan); 2. Muara Labai, muara in the river of Labai^{2}; 3. Muara Labai in Central Kalimantan^{3}
Kadhangdhangan	1. Kadandangan (now Kendawangan sub-district, Ketapang); 2. Kedangdangan^{1}; 3. Kadangdangan^{3}
Landa	Landak Kingdom, now Landak District
Samedhang	1. Samadang (Semandang, the area of Tanjungpura Kingdom); 2. Samedang in Simpang^{3}
Tirem	1. Tirem (Tirun/Tidung Kingdom, now Tarakan city?); 2. Tirem^{1}; 3. Paniraman on the Kapuas Kecil river^{2}; 4. Tidung^{2}
Sedu	1. Sedu (in Sarawak); 2. Sadong in Sarawak or Sedua in Langgau or Siduh in Matan^{12}
Buruneng	Barune (now the country of Brunei)
Kalka	1. Sungai Kaluka or Krian in the south of Sarawak; 2. Kalka, one of the 5 provinces outside Brunei according to the Salsilah Raja Brunei: Kalakah, Seribas, Sadong, Semerahan and Sarawak^{12}; 3. Kalakah, the city of Calaca was a major trading port south of the capital (Brunei) and the center of the country of Sedang^{2}
Saludhung	1. Saludung^{1}; 2. Teluk Maludu^{2}; 3. Sadong^{2}; 4. Maludu^{3}
Solot	1. Solok or Sulu^{123}
Pasir	Pasir (pre-Sultanate of Pasir, now Paser Regency)
Baritw	1. Barito (now North Barito Regency); 2. Baritu^{123}
Sawaku	1. Sawaku (or Sawakung in Berau or Pulau Sebuku sub-district, Kotabaru); 2. Sebuku Island^{12}
Tabalung	1. Tabalung (now Tabalong Regency with its city Tanjungpuri on the banks of the Tabalong river, the first capital of the Banjar sultanate in the Hindu era); 2. Tabalong in Amuntai^{2}
Tunjung Kute	1. Tanjung Kutei (Kutai Kartanegara Sultanate whose capital city is Kutai Lama); 2. Kutai^{2}
Malano	1. Malano ("in Nusa Tanjungpura", the Melanau people of Sarawak and West Kalimantan); 2. Milanau^{2}; 3. Balinean, east of the mouth of the Rejang river in Sarawak or Malanau in northwest Kalimantan^{2}; 4. Milano east of the Rejang river in Sarawak, Balineo^{3}
Notes:^{1} See Atlas van Tropisch Nederland, 1938: 10b^{2} See^{3} See

=== Malayan peninsula ===
In Nagarakretagama it is called "Hujung Medini", which refers to the Malay Peninsula (according to M. Yamin) or Johor (according to Pigeaud).

Name	Interpretation
Pahang	1. Pahang, state of Pahang, Malaysia; 2. Malaya^{2}
Hujung Medini	1. Johor^{2}; 2. Malay Peninsula^{3}
Lengkasuka	1. Langkasuka; 2. On the Lengkawi islands across from Kedah^{2}; 3. Langkasuka-Patani^{2}
Saimwang	1. Semang people's country^{2}; 2. Semong in Negeri Sembilan^{2}; 3. Sai, Saiburi^{2}
Kalanten	Kelantan
Tringgano	Terengganu
Nasor	1. Nisor north of Sai, Patani^{2}; 2. Nasor^{3}
Paka	Paka, now a town in Dungun, Terengganu
Muar	1. Muar, now the district in Johor; 2. Muar, Peken Muar^{2}
Dhungun	1. Dungun, now a district and a major town in Terengganu; 2. Tanjung Utara in Kemaman
Tumasik	Tumasik, now the country of Singapura
Sanghyang Hujung	1. Ujung Salang (junkceylon) in Phuket^{2}; 2. Sening Ujung, between Malacca and Selangor^{2}
Kelang	Klang, (Selangor)
Kedha	1. Kedah; 2. Kataha^{1}; 3. Keda^{3}
Jere	1. Jerai; 2. Jerai, Kedah mountains^{2}; 3. Jering near Patani^{2}; 4. Jere^{3}
Kanjap	1. Kanjab in the Riau-Lingga islands^{2}; 2. Kanjap^{3}
Niran	Karimun, Karimun Besar Island/Nuwi
Notes:^{1} See Atlas van Tropisch Nederland, 1938: 10b^{2} See^{3} See

=== Regions in the east of Java ===
Name	Interpretation
Bali	Bali
Badahulu	Bedahulu Kingdom
Lwagajah	1. Lo Gajah; 2. Lwa-gajah in Bangli^{2}
Gurun	Nusa Penida^{3}
Sukun	Sukun on the island of Nusa Penida
Taliwang	Taliwang (in Sumbawa Island)^{123}
Dompo	1. Dompo (Dompu Kingdom); 2. Dompo in Sumbawa^{1}
Sapi	1. Sapi Island; 2. Sapi in Sumbawa^{2}
Sanghyang Api	1. Sang Hyang Api (Pulau Sangeang); 2. Gunung Api or Sangeang^{12}
Bhima	Bima Island^{12}
Sheran	Seram Island^{12}
Hutan Kadali	Hutan Kendali (Buru Island)^{12}
Gurun	1. Gurun Island; 2. Gorong Islands^{12}; 3. Eucalyptus forest: Buru and Sula Islands^{2}
Lombok Mirah	1. Lombok Merah; 2. Lombok Barat^{2}; 3. Lombok^{3}
Saksak	1. Sasak (said to be "completely ruled"); 2. Saksak, East Lombok^{1}; 3. Lombok Valley^{2}
Bantayan	1. Bantayan (Bantaeng ?); 2. Bantayan^{13}; 3. Bontain^{2}
Luwuk	Luwu (Luwu Kingdom)
Uda Makatraya	1. Udamakatraya and other islands; 2. Uda: Talaud Islands, Uda makatraya: the three main islands of the Talaud archipelago^{2}; 3. Davao in Mindanao, Filipina^{3}
Makhasar	Makassar
Butun	Buton
Banggawi	Banggawi Island (Banggai Islands)
Kunir	1. Kunir Island^{1}; 2. Kunyit Island, south of Laut Island
Galiyau	1. Galian; 2. Galiyao^{3}; 3. Kangean or Lomblem^{23}
Salaya	1. Salayar (Selayar Island); 2. Saleier^{1}
Sumba	Sumba Island
Solot	1. Solor Island; 2. Solot^{1}
Muar	1. Muar^{12}; 2. Muar, Kei Islands; or Honimoa, Saparua^{2}
Wandan	1. Banda Islands; 2. Wandan^{1}
Ambwan	Ambon or Maluku Island
Maloko	Ternate city or Maluku islands
Wwanin	1. Wanin, Onin Peninsula part of Bomberai Peninsula, in Fakfak; 2. Kwanin^{1}; 3. Onin, West Papua, MacCleur bay (now Berau bay)^{2}
Seran	1. Kowiai or Sran in Kaimana^{2}; 2. Marege in northern Australia^{3}
Timur	Timor and several other islands
Notes:^{1} See Atlas van Tropisch Nederland, 1938: 10b^{2} See^{3} See

=== Overseas region ===
Foreign or overseas territories are mentioned in Nagarakretagama canto 15 stanza 1. In addition, in canto 83 stanza 4 and 93 stanza 1 are mentioned the places that became the origin of merchants and scholars.

Name	Interpretation	Relation
Syangka	Siam^{1}	Kachaya (protectorate)
Ayodyapura	Ayutthaya^{1}	Kachaya (protectorate)
Dharmmanagari	Dharmarajanagara: Ligor, Lakkan^{1}	Kachaya (protectorate)
Marutma	1. Martaban^{1}; 2. Mergui^{1}	Kachaya (protectorate)
Rajapura^{1}	Rajpuri in the south of Siam^{1}	Kachaya (protectorate)
Singhanagari^{1}	Singhapuri on the branch of the river Menam, Singhapura, that was mentioned in the Cham inscription^{1}	Kachaya (protectorate)
Campa	Champa^{1}	Kachaya (protectorate)
Kamboja	Cambodia^{1}	Kachaya (protectorate)
Yawana	1. Annam^{1}; 2. Arab^{2}	Mitreka satata (permanent ally/equal friend)
Jambudwipa	India	Sumiwi (subserve)
Cina	China	Sumiwi (subserve)
Karnataka	South India	Sumiwi (subserve)
Goda	Gauḍa or Gaur^{3}, in East India^{1}	Sumiwi (subserve)
Notes:^{1} See^{2} See^{3} See

According to Irawan Djoko Nugroho, the area in the table above from Syangka to Cambodia is called Desantara. Its etymological meaning is "all directions, all space, other regions, other countries". The relationship between Majapahit and Desantara is called kachaya, which means "to be exposed to light". It is interpreted as protected or sheltered. The term "protected area" in the modern state system is referred to as a protectorate.

What is different is Yawana, as mentioned anyat i yawana mitreka satata (different is Yawana who is a permanent ally). Kern and Pigeaud consider Yawana to be Annam, but they noted that Yawana is the Sanskrit term for Greek (Ionian), which the Indians used to refer to barbarians. Kern notes that the Indians referred to Muslims as Yawana. According to Pigeaud, it is somewhat improbable that Yawana refers to the Muslim. He considered Yawana to be Annam, because at that time the kings of Annam were very powerful and it was very strange to ask Java for protection. Nugroho rejected this opinion, because Nagarakretagama was created in 1365, and Champa's power surpassed Annam (which at that time referred to Dai Viet). Majapahit who defeated the Mongols could not have a weak permanent ally. In addition, Annam in Old Javanese language has its own name, namely Koci (now called Cochinchina to distinguish it from Kochi in India). Koci comes from the Chinese Jiāozhǐ, in Cantonese Kawci, and is called Giao Chỉ in Vietnamese. Therefore, Yawana is more accurately interpreted as Arabs.

According to Nugroho, the regions of Jambudwipa, China, Karnataka, and Goda are collectively called Dwipantara. This area is said to have received the favor of the king, so it is natural for them to pay tribute. The kindness done by Majapahit to Dwipantara has a background from Java's war with the Mongols. The Mongols tried to control Asian sea trade, and Java (Singhasari at that time) responded with a blockade of Southeast Asian trade against the Mongols. The Dwipantara area came to face Majapahit led by their priests. In canto 93.1 the priests compose a hymn of praise to the Maharaja of Majapahit. The relationship between Dwipantara to Majapahit is sumiwi (serving). Ambassadors from India and China came with merchants and played a role in stabilizing political and economic relations.

== According to other accounts ==
=== Jayanegara II inscription ===
The Tuhañaru/Jayanagara II inscription, dating from 1245 Saka/1323 AD, records the annexation of territories outside Java:

... like the moon that opens the tunjung-jantung flower from the village of all good people; which destroys all enemies; like the sun that dispels darkness at night, which is delighted by Wipra and Satria, who are happy to be able to uphold the name of the king's coronation, it reads: Iswara Sundarapandyadewa, ...

According to H.B. Sarkar, the title of the king of Jayanegara indicates that Majapahit held high power (suzerainty) over the king of Pandya in South India.

=== Hikayat Raja-Raja Pasai ===
Hikayat Raja-Raja Pasai recorded many territories of Majapahit:

Name	Interpretation
Pasai	Pasai
Tembelan	Tembelan area (?)
Siontan	Siontan island
Jemaja	Jemaja area (?)
Bunguran	Bunguran area (?)
Serasan	Serasan Island
Subi	Subi Island
Pulau Laut	Laut Island
Tioman	Tioman Island
Pulau Tinggi	Tinggi island (?)
Pemanggil Krimat	Pemanggil Krimat area (?)
Belitang	Belitung island
Bangka	Bangka island
Lingga	Lingga area
Riau	Riau
Bintan	Bintan island
Bulong	Buton island
Sambas	Sambas
Mempauh	Mempauh area in Borneo
Sukadana	Sukadana area
Kota Waringin	Kotawaringin
Banjar Masin	Banjarmasin
Pasir	Pasir area (?)
Kotai	Kutai
Berau	Berau area in Borneo
Jambi	Jambi
Palembang	Palembang
Ujung Tanah	Malacca area in Malaya
Banda	Banda island
Bima	Bima island
Sembawa	Sumbawa island
Silamprang	Silamprang island (?)
Asiran	Asiran island (?)
K.r.tok	K.r.tok island (?)
Bali	Bali
Balembangan	Blambangan in East Java

=== Kidung Sunda ===
Based on the Kidung Sunda canto 1 stanza 54b and 65a, Majapahit territories includes Palembang, Tumasik (Singapore), Sampit, Madura, Bali, Koci (Cochinchina, Vietnam), Wandan (Banda, Central Maluku), Tanjungpura (Kalimantan) and Sawakung (Sebuku Island).

=== Kidung Harsa-Wijaya ===
Kidung Harsa Wijaya notes that the territories of Majapahit outside Java include Bali, Tatar, Tumasik, Sampi, Gurun, Wandan, Tanjung-pura, Dompo, Palembang, Makassar, and Koci.

=== Calon Arang manuscripts ===
The story of Calon Arang is mentioned in several manuscripts, originally written during the classical Java era (before the fall of Majapahit in 1527). The manuscripts mentioned Malacca, a sultanate existing between 1400 and 1511. Surviving manuscripts are mostly found in Bali with dates after 1500 CE. Territories mentioned are:

Name	Interpretation
Melayu	Melayu kingdom
Palembang	Palembang
Jambi	Jambi
Bengkulu	Bengkulu
Malaka	Malacca
Singapura	Singapura
Patani	Patani
Pahang	Pahang
Siyem Siam	Siam
Cempa Campa	Champa or a place in Cambodia
Cina	China
Koci	A place in Vietnam
Keling Banakeling	India
Tartar Tatar	Mongol (?)
Pego Pegu	Pegu, a place in Burma
Kedah	Kedah
Kutawaringin	Kotawaringin
Kute	Kutai
Bangka	Bangka
Sunda	Sunda
Madura	Madura
Pedie	Pidie, Aceh
Kangayan Kangean	Kangean island
Makassar	Makassar
Seran	Seram island in Maluku
Goran Goram	Gorong archipelago, Maluku
Pandan Wandan	Wandan or Pandan island
Peleke	A place in Sulawesi (?)
Moloko Maluku	Maluku
Bolo	Bulu Polo'e island, South Sulawesi Bolo, refers to several places in the Philippines
Dompo	Dompu
Bima	Bima
Banda	Banda
Timur	Timor
Sasak	Lombok
Sambawa Sumbawa	Sumbawa

=== Suma Oriental ===
The book Suma Oriental by Tomé Pires written in 1515 records that Java (Majapahit) ruled as far as the Moluccas on the east side and most of the west side of the archipelago; and almost the whole island of Sumatra was under its control and it also controlled all the islands known to the Javanese. Majapahit ruled over these for a long time until about a hundred years earlier, when its power began to wane until it became similar to that during the year of Pires' visit to Java (March–June 1513).

=== Sulalatus Salatin ===
Based on Sulalatus Salatin (Malay Annals) the Majapahit territories include:

- Indragiri in Sumatra and Siantan (now Pontianak on the west coast of Kalimantan), which according to Sulalatus Salatin, were given as wedding gifts to the Sultanate of Malacca for the marriage of the sultan Mansur Shah of Malacca to the princess of Majapahit. Sultan Mansur Shah ruled in 1459–1477, so that in 1447 it meant that Indragiri and Siantan were still under Majapahit rule.
- Jambi and Palembang, which only began to escape from Majapahit's grip when it was taken over by the Demak Sultanate during its war against Majapahit ruled by Ranawijaya.
- And Bali which was the last refugee area for nobles, artists, priests and Hindus in Java when Majapahit conquered by Demak.

=== Hikayat Banjar ===
The territories of Majapahit recorded by Hikayat Banjar are: Java, Bantan (Banten), Palembang, Mangkasar (Makassar), Pahang, Patani, Bali, Pasai, Champa, Maningkabau (Minangkabau), Jambi, Bugis (the area of Bugis people), Johor, and Acih (Aceh).

== Bibliography ==
- Hall, D.G.E. (1981), A History of South-East Asia (4th ed.), London: The Macmillan Press Ltd, ISBN 978-1-349-16521-6
- Muljana, Raden Benedictus Slamet (2005), Al-Fayyadl, Muhammad (ed.), Menuju Puncak Kemegahan: Sejarah Kerajaan Majapahit, Yogyakarta: LKiS Pelangi Aksara
- Nugroho, Irawan Djoko (2009), Meluruskan Sejarah Majapahit, Ragam Media
- Nugroho, Irawan Djoko (2011), Majapahit Peradaban Maritim, Suluh Nuswantara Bakti, ISBN 978-602-9346-00-8
- Pigeaud, Theodoor Gautier Thomas (1960a), Java in the 14th Century: A Study in Cultural History, Volume I: Javanese Texts in Transcription (3rd (revised) ed.), The Hague: Martinus Nijhoff
- Pigeaud, Theodoor Gautier Thomas (1960b), Java in the 14th Century: A Study in Cultural History, Volume II: Notes on the Texts and the Translations (3rd (revised) ed.), The Hague: Martinus Nijhoff, ISBN 978-94-011-8774-9
- Pigeaud, Theodoor Gautier Thomas (1960c), Java in the 14th Century: A Study in Cultural History, Volume III: Translations (3rd (revised) ed.), The Hague: Martinus Nijhoff, ISBN 978-94-011-8772-5
- Pigeaud, Theodoor Gautier Thomas (1962), Java in the 14th Century: A Study in Cultural History, Volume IV: Commentaries and Recapitulations (3rd (revised) ed.), The Hague: Martinus Nijhoff, ISBN 978-94-017-7133-7
- Pigeaud, Theodoor Gautier Thomas (1963), Java in the 14th Century: A Study in Cultural History, Volume V: Glossary, General Index (3rd (revised) ed.), The Hague: Martinus Nijhoff, ISBN 978-94-011-8778-7
- Prapanca, Mpu (2018), Isidora (ed.), Kakawin Nagarakertagama: Teks Asli dan Terjemahan, translated by Saktiani, Damaika; Widya, Kartika; Aminullah, Zakaria Pamuji; Marginingrum, Novi; Septi, Neda (2nd (revised) ed.), Yogyakarta: Narasi, ISBN 978-979-168-553-5
- Ras, Johannes Jacobus (1968), Hikajat Bandjar: A Study in Malay Historiography, The Hague: Martinus Nijhoff
