= Dyah Pitaloka Citraresmi =

Princess of Sunda Kingdom in Western Java (1340–1357)

Dyah Pitaloka
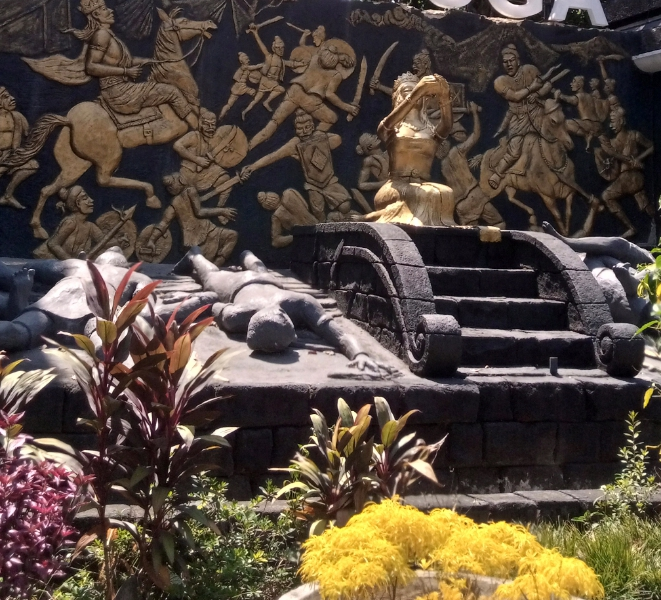
- Statue depicting the princess Pitaloka (on top of the stairs) committing suicide during Battle of Bubat
- Born: 1340
- Died: 1357 (aged 16–17); Bubat Field, North Wilwatikta, Kingdom of Majapahit
- Cause of death: Suicide
- Burial place: Astana Gede Kawali, Kawali, Kingdom of Sunda Galuh
- Other name: Citraresmi or Citra Rashmi
- Occupation: Battle of Bubat
- Parents: Prabu Maharaja Linggabuana (father); Dewi Lara Linsing (mother)
- Relatives: Niskala Wastu Kancana (younger brother)

Dyah Pitaloka Citraresmi or Citra Rashmi (1340–1357), was the princess of the United Sunda Kingdom and Galuh Kingdom in Western Java. According to the Pararaton or Book of Kings, she was supposed to marry Hayam Wuruk, the new young king of Majapahit who had a great desire to take her as his queen. However, in the tragedy known as The Bubat Incident, she took her own life. Tradition describes her as a young woman of extraordinary beauty.

== Wedding proposal ==
Hayam Wuruk, king of Majapahit decided, probably for political reasons, to take Princess Citra Rashmi (Pitaloka) as his spouse. She was a daughter of Prabu Maharaja Lingga Buana of the Sunda Kingdom. Patih Madhu, a matchmaker from Majapahit was sent to the kingdom to ask for her hand in royal marriage. Delighted by the proposal and seeing the opportunity to foster an alliance with Majapahit, the mightiest kingdom in the region, the king of Sunda gave his blessing and decided to accompany his daughter to Majapahit for the wedding.

In 1357 the Sunda king and the royal family arrived in Majapahit after sailing across the Java Sea then encamped on Bubat square in the northern part of Trowulan, capital city of Majapahit, and awaited the wedding ceremony. However, Gajah Mada, the Majapahit prime minister saw the event as an opportunity to demand Sunda's submission to Majapahit overlordship and insisted that instead of becoming queen of Majapahit, the princess was to be presented as a token of submission and treated as a mere concubine of the Majapahit king. The Sunda king was angered and humiliated by Gajah Mada's demand.

== Suicide of the princess ==
As a result, a skirmish popularly known as the Battle of Bubat took place in Bubat Square between the Majapahit army and the Sunda royal family in defense of their honour. Despite courageous resistance, the royal family was overwhelmed and decimated by the Majapahit army with almost all of the Sundanese royal party massacred in the tragedy. Tradition mentions that the heartbroken Princess took her own life to defend the honour and pride of her country.

According to tradition, Dyah Pitaloka's death was mourned by Hayam Wuruk and the entire population of the Sunda kingdom who had lost most members of their royal family. Her deed and her father's courage are revered as noble acts of honour, courage, and dignity in Sundanese tradition. Her father, Prabu Maharaja Lingga Buana was revered by the Sundanese as Prabu Wangi (Sundanese: king with pleasant fragrance) because of his heroic act of defending his honour against Majapahit. His descendants, the later kings of Sunda, were called Siliwangi (Sundanese: successor of Wangi). This tragedy severely harmed the relationship between the two kingdoms and resulted in hostility for years to come, the situation never again returning to normality. Gajah Mada faced opposition, distrust, and sneering at the Majapahit court because of his careless act which was not to the taste of the Majapahit nobles and undermined King Hayam Wuruk's influence.

The story of the Princess Pitaloka and the battle of Bubat is the main theme of the Kidung Sunda while an historical account of Pasunda Bubat is also mentioned in Pararaton, but not in the Nagarakretagama.

== See also ==
- Kidung Sunda
- Pararaton
- Sunda Kingdom
