= Kaso River (Sukabumi) =

River in Sukabumi city, west Java

Kaso River Ci Kaso, Cikaso, Tjikaso, Tji Kaso
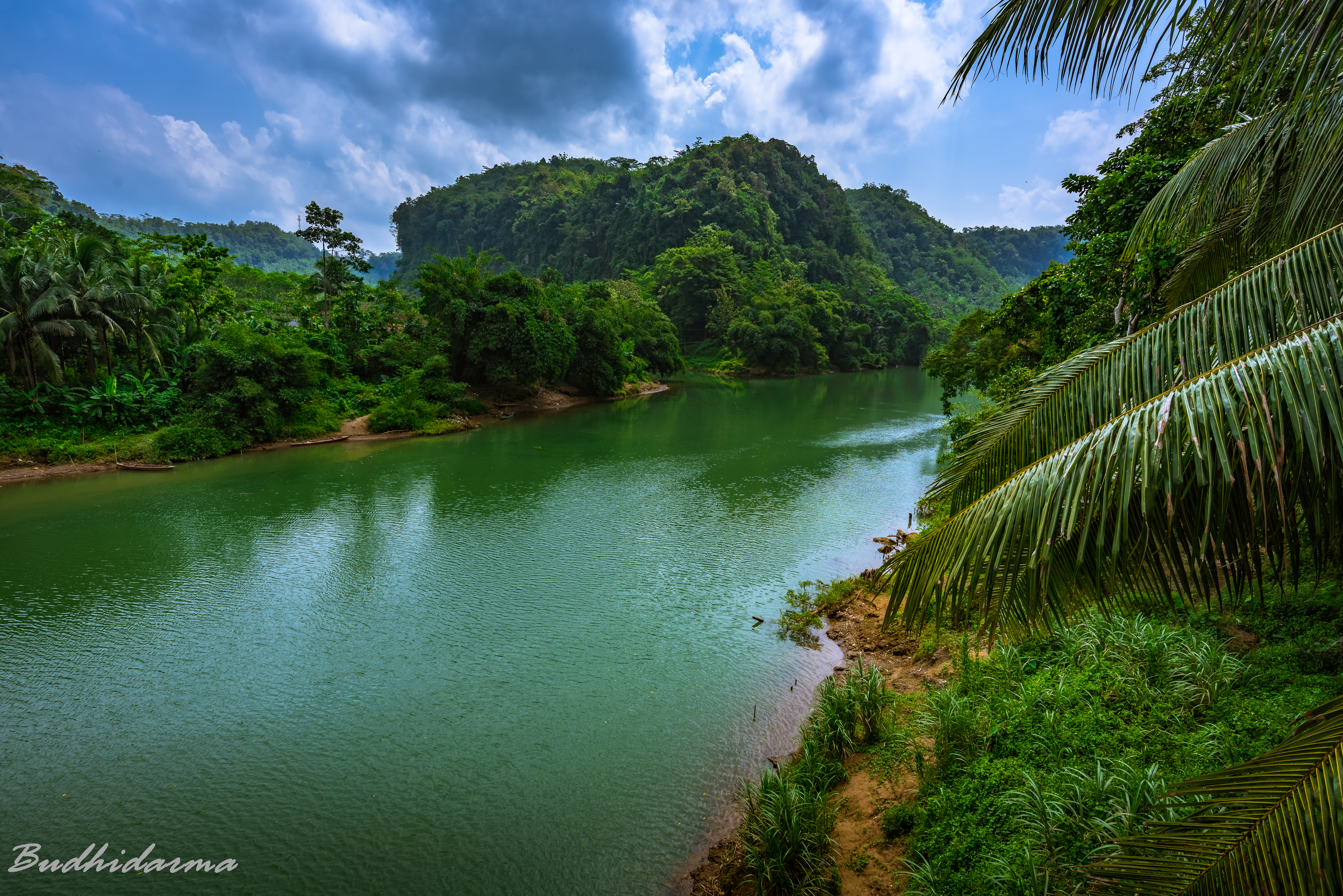
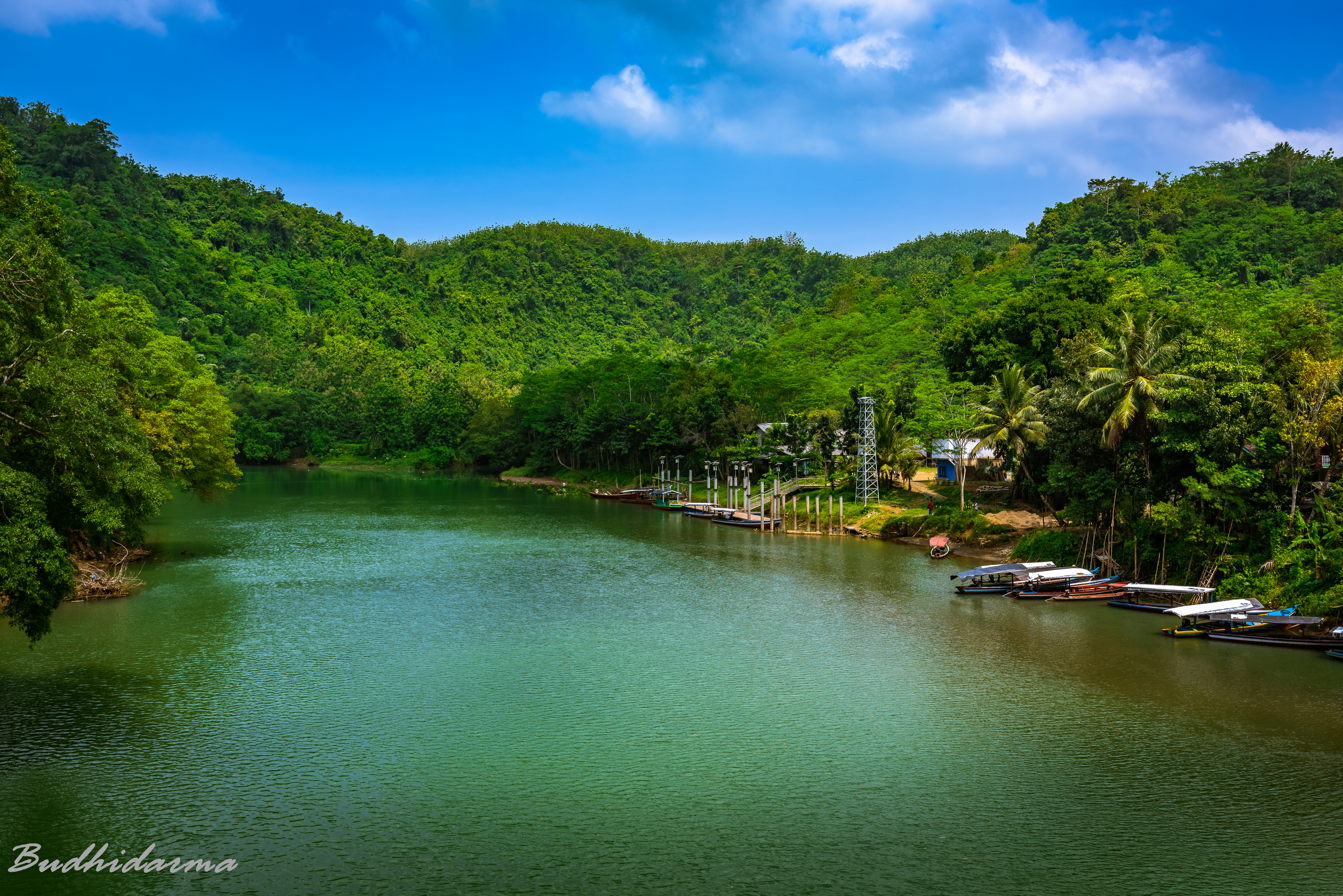
- Cikaso river, Southern Sukabumi Regency A river boat at Cikaso river - Indonesia carrying motorcycles. River transports are common in the area.
- Cikaso river, source and mouth location

Location
- Country: Indonesia
- Province: West Java

Physical characteristics
- Source
  - location: Nyalindung, Sukabumi Regency
  - coordinates: 7.0528457°S 06.9200421°E
  - elevation: 820 m (2,690 ft)
- Mouth: Indian Ocean
  - location: Tegal Buleud, Sukabumi Regency
  - coordinates: 7.4231°S 106.6810°E
- Basin size: 900 km^{2} (350 sq mi)

Basin features
- River system: Cikaso basin (DAS210719)
- Waterfalls: Cikaso waterfall

Kaso River, also known as Ci Kaso, is a river in Sukabumi Regency, West Java, Indonesia, about 140 km south of the capital Jakarta.

== Hydrology ==
The Cikaso River originates in North Sukabumi and flows south to the Surade subdistrict in South Sukabumi. The Cikaso waterfall is in the Ujung tourist area between Jampang Kulon and Surade. The waterfalls have a height of almost 80 metres (260 ft), with three parallel drops along cliffs that are about 100 feet (30 m) wide. The falls are accessible from the Ciniti, Cibitung village in the Cibitung Kulon sub-Jampang. They can be reached by foot or by motor boat.

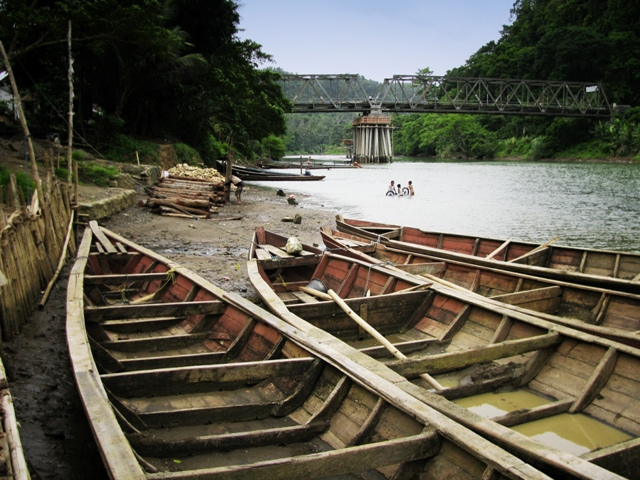
Boats at Ujung Genteng below the Cikaso waterfall

Kaso river is the main stem in the Cikaso drainage basin. The Cikaso basin is bordered by the Cibuni basin to the east, the Cikarang basin to the west, and the Cimandiri basin to the north. All of drainage basins are part of the group of drainage basins of the south coast of Java, where their main stem flow into the Indian Ocean.

== Geography ==
The river flows in the southwest area of Java with predominantly tropical monsoon climate (designated as Am in the Köppen-Geiger climate classification). The annual average temperature in the area is 23 °C. The warmest month is August, when the average temperature is around 26 °C, and the coldest is January, at 20 °C. The average annual rainfall is 3834 mm. The wettest month is December, with an average of 578 mm rainfall, and the driest is September, with 35 mm rainfall.

== See also ==
- List of drainage basins of Indonesia
- List of rivers of Indonesia
- List of rivers of Java
