= Palabuhanratu Bay =

- Pelabuhan Ratu Bay; Wijnkoopsbaai
- Teluk Palabuhanratu (Indonesian)
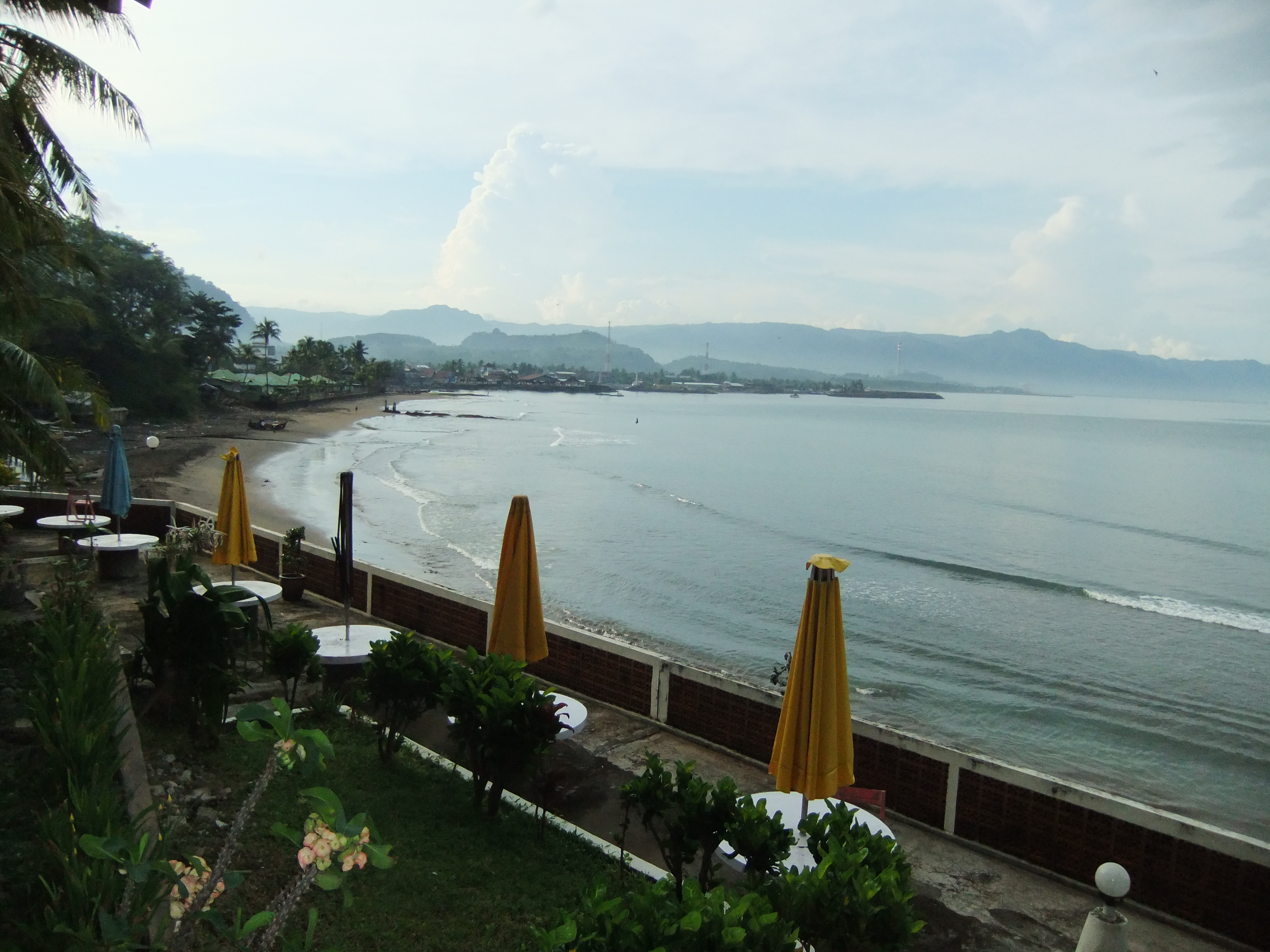
- Palabuhanratu Bay

- Location within Java
- Location: South East Asia
- Coordinates: 7°03′00″S 106°27′00″E
- Type: Bay
- Basin countries: Indonesia
- References: Teluk Pelabuhanratu: Indonesia National Geospatial-Intelligence Agency, Bethesda, MD, USA

Palabuhanratu Bay (Indonesian: Teluk Palabuhanratu; Dutch: Wijnkoopsbaai) or Pelabuhan Ratu (Sundanese for: Harbor of the Queen) is the largest bay on the coast of the Indian Ocean in the south of West Java. Palabuhanratu fishing village is the major sea port of the bay. Geographically, Palabuhanratu Bay is located at positions 6 ° 57 'to 7 ° 07' LS and 106 ° 22 'to 106 ° 33' BT with a coastline of 105 km. The bay is U-shaped.

Palabuhanratu Bay is also known for it marine life and lobster diversity in particular. Several rivers flow into Palabuhanratu Bay, some of which are the following:

- Cimandiri River
- Cibareno River
- Cikanteh River

== See also ==
- Cihara River
- Ciletuh-Palabuhanratu Geopark
- Mount Halimun Salak National Park
- Ujung Kulon National Park

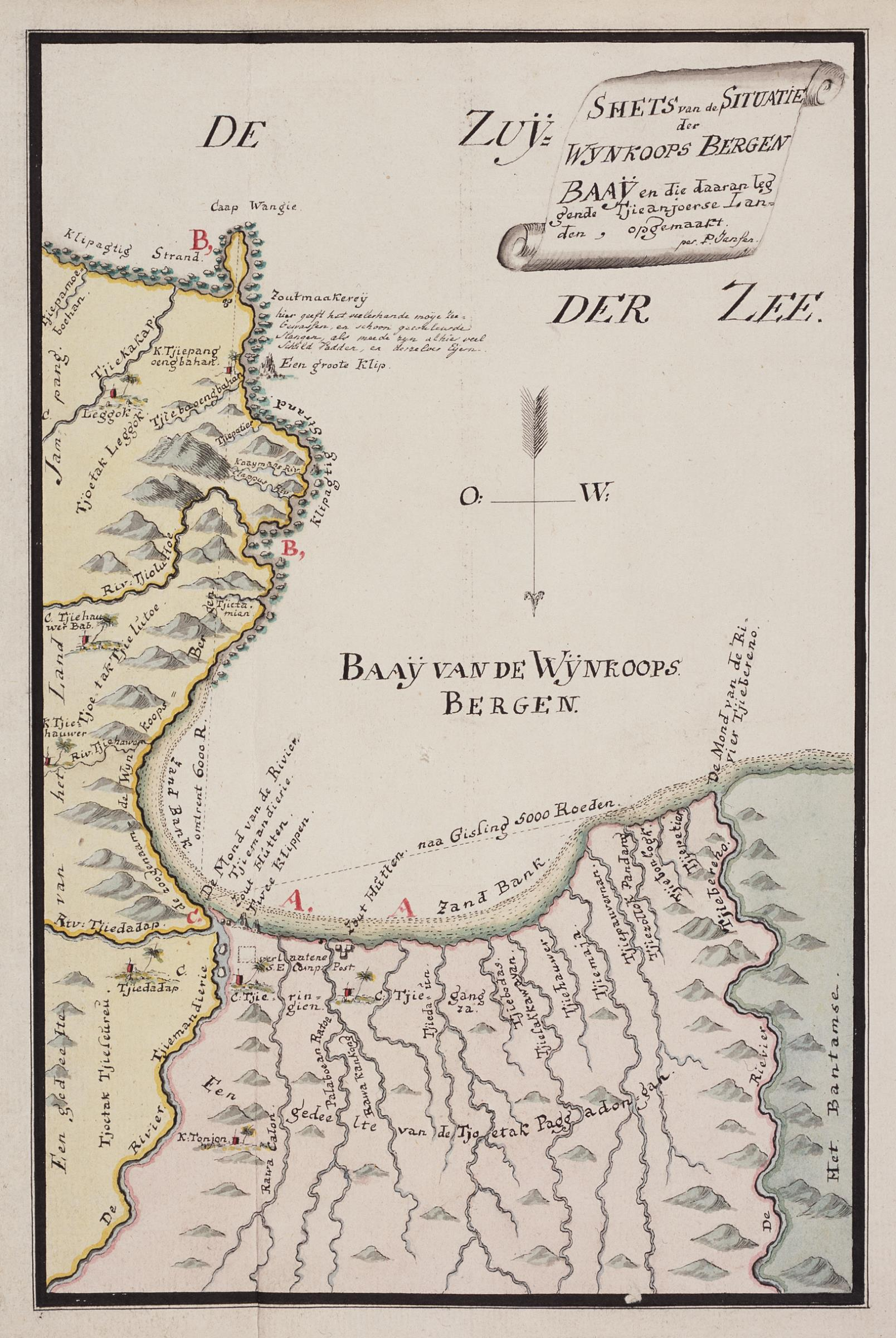
Sketch map of Palabuhanratu Bay (Wÿnkoops Bergen Baaÿ), 1789.
