= Cikaso Waterfall =

Waterfall in Java, Indonesia

- Location within Java
- Coordinates: 7°21′39″S 106°37′07″E
- Total height: 80 metres (260 ft)
- Total width: 30 metres (98 ft)
- Watercourse: Cikaso River

Cikaso Waterfall is a dramatic waterfall on the Cikaso River in Western Java.

Cikaso Waterfall is on the Cikaso River, which originates in North Sukabumi and flows south to the Surade District in South Sukabumi. It lies in the Ujung tourist area between Jampang Kulon and Surade. The waterfalls have a height of almost 80 metres (260 ft), with three parallel drops along cliffs that are about 100 feet (30 m) wide. The falls are accessible from the Ciniti, Cibitung village in the Cibitung Kulon sub-Jampang. They can be reached by foot or by motor boat.
