= Bombing of Sukabumi =

1942 aerial bombing of Java during WWII

The bombing of Sukabumi was an aerial bombing of the city of Sukabumi, West Java in the Dutch East Indies (present-day Indonesia) during the Dutch East Indies campaign of World War II. On the morning of Friday, 6 March 1942, a formation of seven Imperial Japanese aircraft indiscriminately bombed and strafed government buildings, infrastructure, and residential areas, resulting in the deaths of around 70 people and destruction throughout the city.

== The attack ==
Although an attack of this kind had been expected from the start of the Japanese invasion, the people of Sukabumi were taken by complete surprise. On the Dr. de Vogelweg (present-day Jalan Bhayangkara), the police academy and the local Muhammadiyah school were attacked, killing 26 children. In addition, the offices of the forestry bureau (Dutch: Boschwezen), the NIROM building, the Sukabumi Regency offices, and a number of residences on the Wilhelminaweg (present-day Jalan R. E. Martadinata) were hit. The forester of the Boschwezen was among those injured.

Due to poor functioning of the air defense force, the enemy aircraft were not discovered in time, although they had been noticed by a 'spotter' from the police academy. There, an alarm bell was sounded, but the air-raid siren was not activated, as an order to that effect was not given for unknown reasons. After the attack, the academy was permanently closed and its European and Indo-European staff transferred to the Sukabumi city police. During the first weeks of the occupation, non-native Indonesian police officers were ignored by the Japanese, but on 22 April 1942 they would be interned.

Bombs dropped near the Sukabumi train station severed the railway line to Bandung, and the native railway workers who operated the signals and switches had fled.

Residential neighborhoods were also targeted and many people were injured. An officer of the city police, who was at home because he had worked a night shift, was fatally struck by a bomb fragment. Elsewhere, a desa school was hit by a bomb, killing 43 people. The surviving students assisted the authorities in transporting the injured.

== Reasons for the bombing ==
From the destruction wrought on strategic targets, it seemed clear that the Japanese intended to hinder troops of the 1st Division of the Royal Netherlands East Indies Army (Dutch: Koninklijk Nederlandsch-Indisch Leger; KNIL) during their retreat to the Bandung Plateau. As a result of the severing of the railway line, KNIL troops were stranded at Sukabumi train station, where they spent the night before continuing on foot and by confiscated vehicles. Other reasons for the bombardment are unclear; the bombing of schools and other civilian targets creates uncertainty.

Three days after the bombing of Sukabumi the Dutch East Indies capitulated, and a week after the bombing the city was occupied by Japanese troops.

== See also ==
- Aerial bombing of cities
- Dutch East Indies campaign
- Battle of Java (1942)
- Battle of Tjiater Pass
