= Cisaat =

- District

Regional transcription(s)
  - Sundanese: ᮕᮜᮘᮥᮠᮔ᮪ᮛᮒᮥ
- Interactive map of Cisaat
- Country: Indonesia
- Province: West Java
- Regency: Sukabumi Regency

Area
  - Total: 21.49 km^{2} (8.30 sq mi)

Population (mid 2024 estimate)
  - Total: 134,855
  - Density: 6,275/km^{2} (16,250/sq mi)
- Time zone: UTC+7 (IWST)
- Postal code: 43152 (mostly)
- Area code: (+62) 266
- Villages: 13

Cisaat is a village (desa) and an administrative district (kecamatan) in Sukabumi Regency, West Java Province of Indonesia. It is situated to the immediate northwest of the city of Sukabumi, of which it is effectively a suburb.

The village, which is the administrative centre for the district, had 8,984 inhabitants in mid 2024, while the district as a whole had 134,855. The district is composed of thirteen nominally rural villages (desa), although these are now effectively suburban communities, with an average population density of 6,275 per km^{2}. They are tabulated below with their areas and the populations as at 2024, as well as their post codes.

Kode Wilayah	Name of desa	Area in km^{2}	Population mid 2024 estimate	Post code
32.02.29.2001	Gunungjaya	1.63	7,679	43152
32.02.29.2002	Sukasari	1.70	11,350	43134
32.02.29.2003	Sukamanah	1.03	11,735	43152
32.02.29.2004	Cisaat (village)	1.24	8,984	43152
32.02.29.2005	Nagrak	1.09	11,758	43132
32.02.29.2006	Babakan	2.19	7,345	43152
32.02.29.2007	Sukamantri	0.89	8,876	43152
32.02.29.2008	Cibatu	1.57	11,878	43152
32.02.29.2009	Selajambe	1.71	10,723	43152
32.02.29.2010	Padaasih	2.55	10,317	43152
32.02.29.2011	Cibolang Kaler	1.36	11,833	43152
32.02.29.2012	Kutasirna	1.49	5,595	43152
32.02.29.2013	Sukaresmi	2.93	16,782	43152
32.02.29	Totals	21.49	134,855	

Cibolang Kaler, Cibatu, Cisaat, Babakan, Sukamantri and Padaasih villages comprise the southern half of the district, while Kutasirna, Selajambe, Gunungjaya, Sukasari, Nagrak, Sukamanah and Sukaresmi villages comprise the northern half.
