= Tegal Buleud =

Tegal Buleud Kecamatan tegal buleud
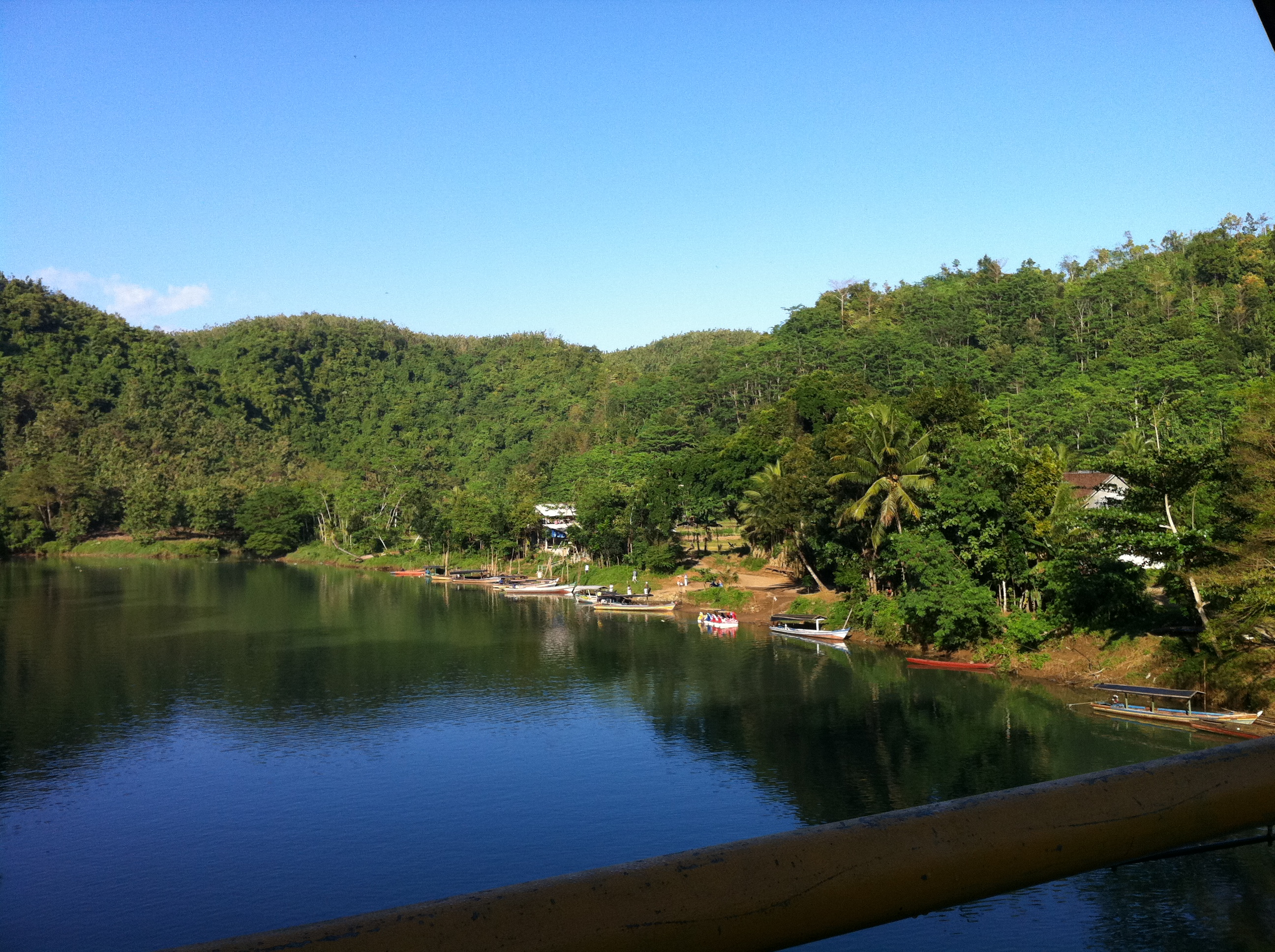
- Interactive map of Tegal Buleud
- Coordinates: 7°21′28.2″S 106°37′19.2″E
- Country: Indonesia
- Province: West Java
- Regency: Sukabumi
- District: Tegal Buleud

Government
  - Type: District of Sukabumi
  - Camat: Unknown

Area
  - Total: 255.52 km^{2} (98.66 sq mi)

Population (2023)
  - Total: 37,175
- Time zone: UTC+7 (WIB)
- Area code: +62 266

Tegal Buleud (or Tegalbuleud) is a district (Indonesian: kecamatan) in Sukabumi Regency, West Java, Indonesia, situated approximately 90 km (56 mi) south of Sukabumi. The altitude across the kecamatan ranges from 0 to 200 m (0 to 656 ft). It is the second-largest kecamatan in the Sukabumi Regency, with only Ciemas being larger. It also has the smallest population density of any kecamatan in the Sukabumi Regency.

Tegalbuleud kecamatan contains eight villages.

It is characterized by extensive rice fields, rubber plantations, and a warmer climate compared to the surrounding highlands. The district is also a destination for surfing and coastal fishing, with ongoing industrial development including steel production in Buniasih village.
