= Gunungguruh =

Coordinates: 6°57′00″S 106°54′20″E

- District

Regional transcription(s)
  - Sundanese: ᮕᮜᮘᮥᮠᮔ᮪ᮛᮒᮥ
- Interactive map of Gunungguruh
- Country: Indonesia
- Province: West Java
- Regency: Sukabumi Regency

Area
  - Total: 26.31 km^{2} (10.16 sq mi)

Population (mid 2024 estimate)
  - Total: 59,615
  - Density: 2,266/km^{2} (5,869/sq mi)
- Time zone: UTC+7 (IWST)
- Postal code: 43152 (mostly)
- Area code: (+62) 266
- Villages: 13

Gunungguruh is a village (desa) and an administrative district (kecamatan) in Sukabumi Regency, West Java Province of Indonesia. It is situated to the immediate west of the city of Sukabumi, of which it is effectively a suburb.

The village, which is the administrative centre for the district, had 11,104 inhabitants in mid 2024, while the district as a whole had 59,615. The district is composed of seven nominally rural villages (desa), although these are now effectively suburban communities, with an average population density of 2,266 per km^{2}. They are tabulated below with their areas and the populations as at 2024. They share the post code 43156.

Kode Wilayah	Name of desa	Area in km^{2}	Population mid 2024 estimate
32.02.27.2004	Sirnaresmi	6.95	9,871
32.02.27.2005	Kebonmanggu	4.23	6,838
32.02.27.2002	Gunungguruh (village)	3.73	11,104
32.02.27.2001	Cikujang	4.76	10,033
32.02.27.2003	Cibentang	2.18	4,233
32.02.27.2006	Cibolang	3.08	10,292
32.02.27.2007	Mangkalaya	1.37	7,244
32.02.27	Totals	26.31	59,615

Sirnaresmi and Kebonmanggu are situated to the southwest of the other five desa, and have the lowest densities of population.
