= Kebonpedes =

- District

Regional transcription(s)
  - Sundanese: ᮕᮜᮘᮥᮠᮔ᮪ᮛᮒᮥ
- Interactive map of Kebonpedes
- Country: Indonesia
- Province: West Java
- Regency: Sukabumi Regency

Area
  - Total: 10.83 km^{2} (4.18 sq mi)

Population (mid 2024 estimate)
  - Total: 35,487
  - Density: 3,277/km^{2} (8,487/sq mi)
- Time zone: UTC+7 (IWST)
- Postal code: 43152 (mostly)
- Area code: (+62) 266
- Villages: 13

Kebonpedes is a village (desa) and an administrative district (kecamatan) in Sukabumi Regency, West Java Province of Indonesia. It is situated to the immediate east of the city of Sukabumi, of which it is effectively a suburb.

The village, which is the administrative centre for the district, had 8,184 inhabitants in mid 2024, while the district as a whole had 35,487. The district is composed of five nominally rural villages (desa), although these are now effectively suburban communities, with an average population density of 3,277 per km^{2}. They are tabulated below with their areas and the populations as at 2024. They share the post code 43194.

Kode Wilayah	Name of desa	Area in km^{2}	Population mid 2024 estimate
32.02.34.2001	Kebonpedes (village)	2.52	8,184
32.02.34.2002	Cikaret	1.65	6,363
32.02.34.2003	Bojongsawah	3.53	7,969
32.02.34.2004	Sasagaran	1.49	6,144
32.02.34.2005	Jambenenggang	1.65	6,827
32.02.34	Totals	10.83	35,487
