= Palabuhanratu =

- District

Regional transcription(s)
  - Sundanese: ᮕᮜᮘᮥᮠᮔ᮪ᮛᮒᮥ
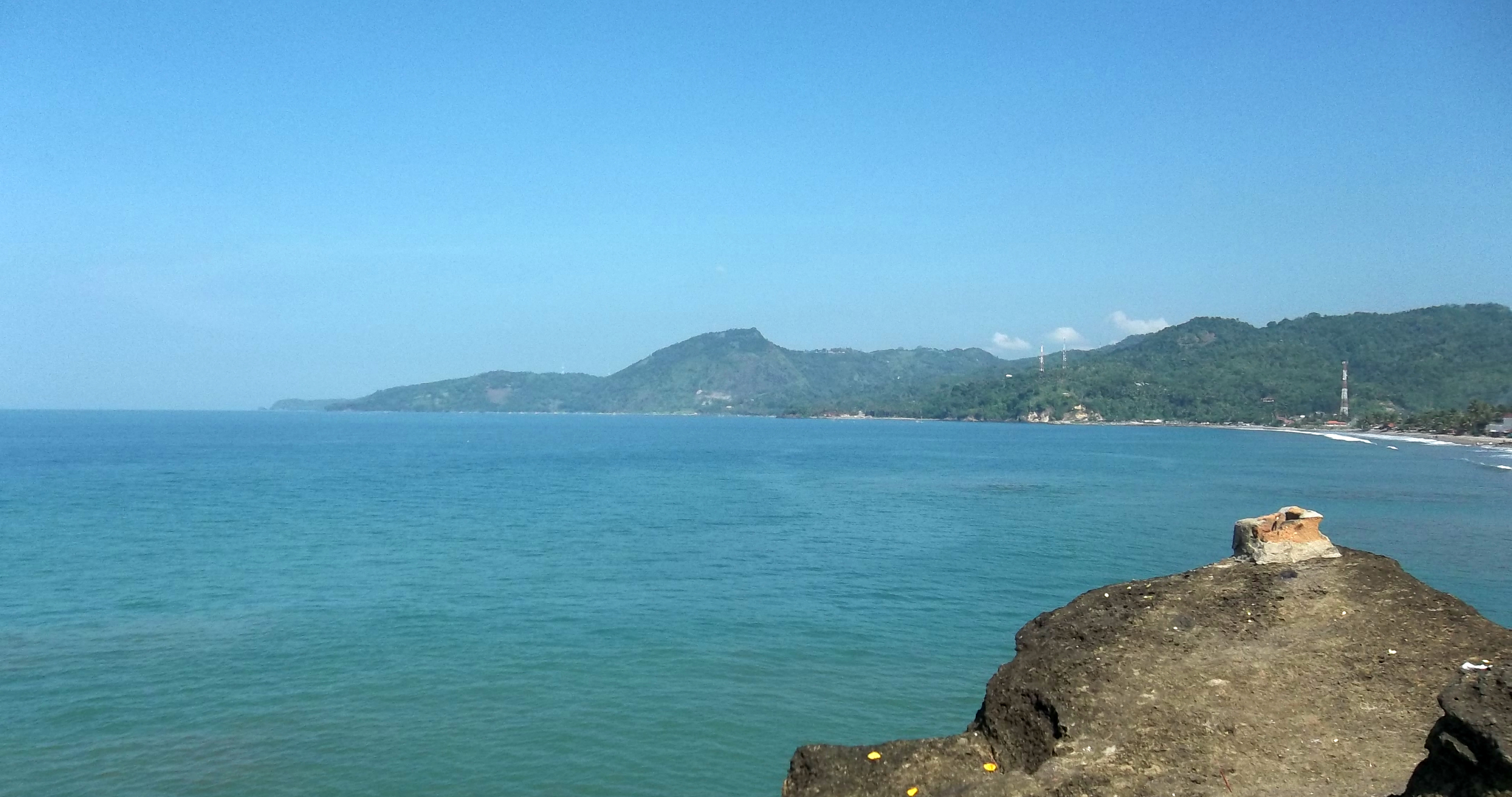
- Palabuhanratu Bay

- Location in Java and Indonesia Palabuhanratu (Indonesia)
- Coordinates: 6°59′16″S 106°32′38″E
- Country: Indonesia
- Province: West Java
- Regency: Sukabumi Regency

Government
  - Camat: Ahmad Samsul Bahri
  - Secretary: Deni Yudono

Area
  - Total: 91.77 km^{2} (35.43 sq mi)
- Elevation: 50 m (160 ft)

Population (mid 2024 estimate)
  - Total: 124,596
  - Density: 1,358/km^{2} (3,516/sq mi)
- Time zone: UTC+7 (IWST)
- Postal code: 43364
- Area code: (+62) 266
- Villages: 10

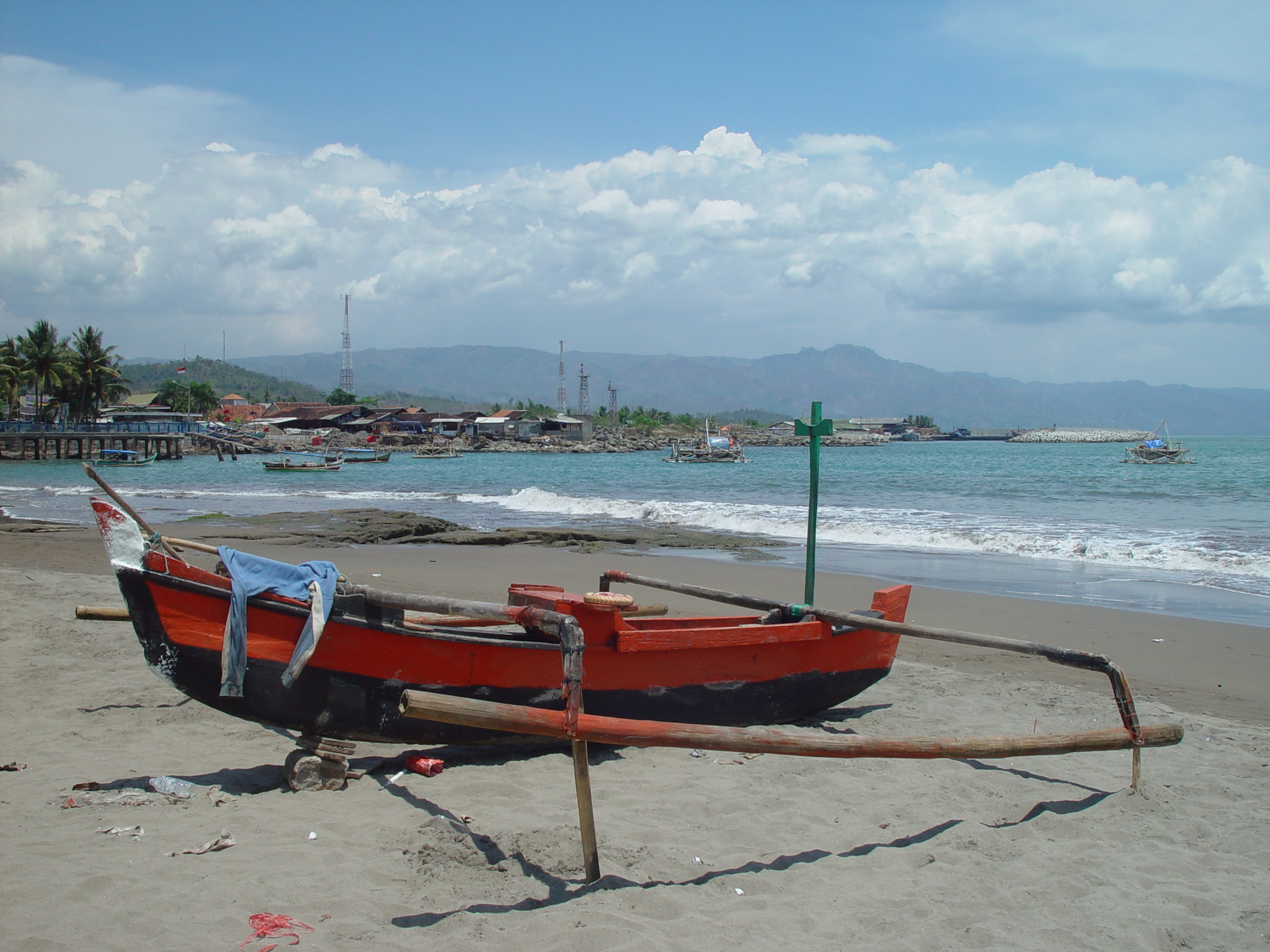
Fishing boat harbour at Pelabuhan Ratu

Palabuhanratu or Pelabuhan Ratu (Sundanese for: 'Queen's Harbor') is an administrative district (kecamatan) and a fishing town which serves as the regency seat of Sukabumi Regency. The town is at the southwest coast of Palabuhanratu Bay, West Java facing the Indian Ocean. It is a four-hour drive from Bandung and up to a 12-hour drive from Indonesia's capital Jakarta due to traffic jams in Ciawi, Cicurug, Cibadak and Pelabuhan Ratu gate, whose residents love to visit the bay 'Teluk Palabuhanratu', once named 'Wijnkoopersbaai' (wine merchant's bay) by the Dutch. The bay is shaped like a horseshoe and has enormous waves that can be very treacherous. The Sundanese locals say that the Indian Ocean is the home of Nyai Loro Kidul who reigns along the southern coast of Java.

The town had 37,477 inhabitants in mid 2024, while the district had 124,596. The district is composed of the town (kelurahan) and nine surrounding rural villages (desa), all sharing the postcode 43364. These are tabulated below with their areas and the populations as at 2024.

Kode Wilayah	Name of desa	Area in km^{2}	Population mid 2024 estimate
32.02.01.1001	Palabuhanratu (town)	6.01	37,477
32.02.01.2002	Tonjong	8.65	6,979
32.02.01.2003	Citepus	15.02	15,807
32.02.01.2004	Buniwangi	6.66	6,250
32.02.01.2005	Cibodas	9.42	9,887
32.02.01.2006	Pasirsuren	5.74	8,520
32.02.01.2007	Cikadu	13.52	10,042
32.02.01.2008	Citarik	11.01	15,869
32.02.01.2009	Cimanggu	10.30	5,956
32.02.01.2010	Jayanti	5.42	7,809
32.02.01	Totals	91.77	124,596

== Economy ==
=== Ocean fishing port ===
The current port has been improved to become an ocean fishing port with an investment of IDR 415 billion ($48.8 million) on a 17-hectare area expansion. The project was initialized in September 2011.

== Tourism ==
=== Coastline ===
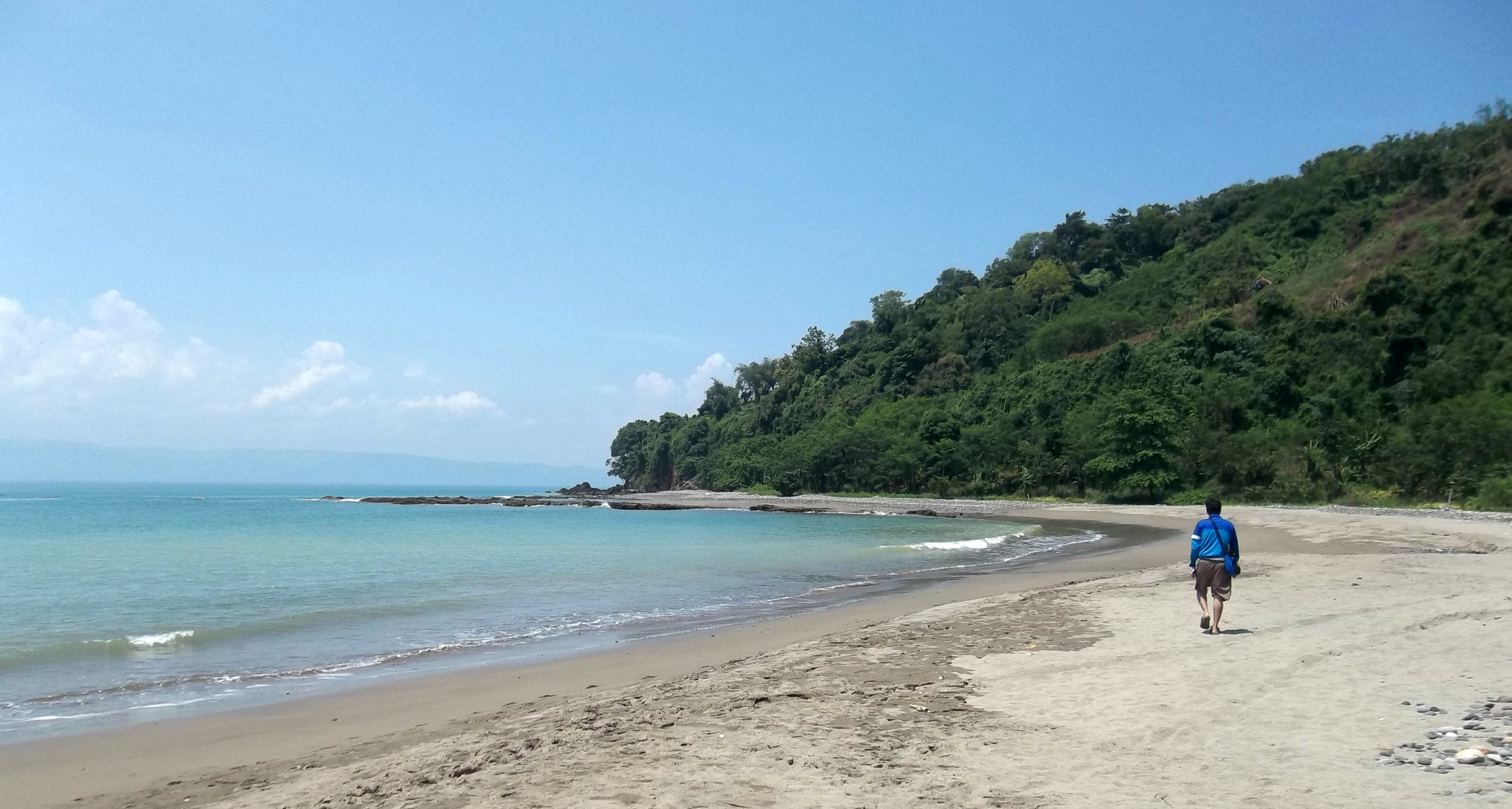
Beach at Pelabuhan Ratu, Sukabumi, West Java, Indonesia

The Pelabuhan Ratu's white sands beach is a popular vacation destination for visitors from Sukabumi, Bogor, Bandung, and Jakarta. However, because of high rolling waves, some spots on the beach are considered too dangerous for swimming. Together with Pangandaran, the beaches are popular in West Java, both facing south towards the Indian Ocean.

Hotels, restaurants, resorts, and tourism facilities were built in the vicinity. Among the oldest is The Samudra Beach Hotel, established in 1966 and commissioned by then-Indonesian president Sukarno. Sukarno was involved with the exact location and the idea for the Samudra Beach Hotel. The hotel keeps room 308 furnished with green colours and reserved for Nyai Loro Kidul. A painting of Nyai Rara Kidul by Basuki Abdullah, a famous Indonesian painter, is displayed in this room.

=== Surfing location ===
Palabuhanratu has become a popular location for surfers in recent years, with its Indian Ocean location providing good waves. Several spots that are popular with surfers are Cimaja Beach, Sunset Beach, Karang Sari Beach, and Karang Aji Beach.

From 12 to 18 June 2011 the second event of the West Java Surfing Championship was held at Cimaja Beach: a 750-metre beach with waves about 1 to 2 metres high. The competition got 6 stars surfing premium (the highest rank) as a part of the Indonesian Surfing Championship and Asian Surfing Championship Tours. Cimaja Beach has many rocks, so sometimes it is called 'Beach Without Sand'.

== Climate ==
Palabuhanratu has a tropical rainforest climate (Af) with moderate rainfall from June to September and heavy to very heavy truck rainfall from October to May.

Climate data for Palabuhanratu
Month	Jan	Feb	Mar	Apr	May	Jun	Jul	Aug	Sep	Oct	Nov	Dec	Year
Mean daily maximum °C (°F)	30.5 (86.9)	30.8 (87.4)	31.5 (88.7)	31.7 (89.1)	31.9 (89.4)	31.7 (89.1)	31.8 (89.2)	32.0 (89.6)	32.4 (90.3)	32.4 (90.3)	31.9 (89.4)	31.4 (88.5)	31.7 (89.0)
Daily mean °C (°F)	26.5 (79.7)	26.6 (79.9)	26.9 (80.4)	27.1 (80.8)	27.2 (81.0)	26.7 (80.1)	26.6 (79.9)	26.5 (79.7)	27.0 (80.6)	27.2 (81.0)	27.1 (80.8)	27.1 (80.8)	567.0 (1,052.6)
Mean daily minimum °C (°F)	22.5 (72.5)	22.4 (72.3)	22.4 (72.3)	22.6 (72.7)	22.6 (72.7)	21.8 (71.2)	21.4 (70.5)	21.1 (70.0)	21.6 (70.9)	22.1 (71.8)	22.4 (72.3)	22.8 (73.0)	22.1 (71.9)
Average rainfall mm (inches)	349 (13.7)	298 (11.7)	337 (13.3)	235 (9.3)	190 (7.5)	114 (4.5)	117 (4.6)	98 (3.9)	118 (4.6)	223 (8.8)	379 (14.9)	384 (15.1)	2,842 (111.9)
Source: Climate-Data.org

== See also ==
- Ciletuh-Palabuhanratu Geopark
