= Ciletuh-Palabuhanratu Geopark =

Geological park in Indonesia

Coordinates: 6.974610°S 106.527763°E

- Taman Bumi Ciletuh-Palabuhanratu
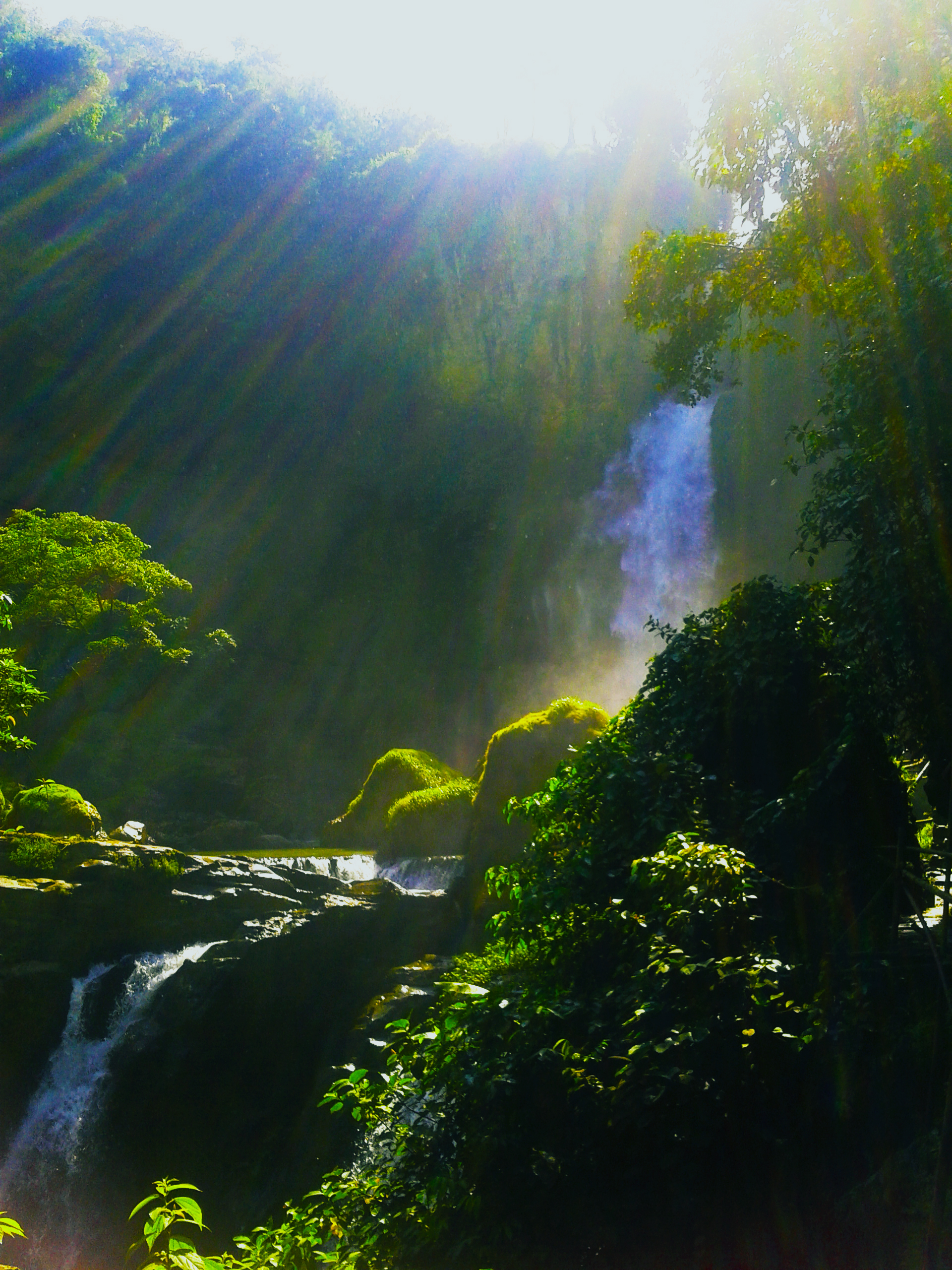
- Curug Cimarinjung waterfall

- Location within Indonesia
- Location: Pelabuhan Ratu, West Java, Indonesia
- Nearest city: Sukabumi
- Area: 128,000 ha (320,000 acres)

Ciletuh-Palabuhanratu Geopark (Indonesian: Taman Bumi Ciletuh-Palabuhanratu) is a national Geopark in Sukabumi Regency, West Java, Indonesia. It was recognized by UNESCO in 2015 as a national geopark, and it was proposed to become a member of the Global Geopark Network (GGN) to be recognized by UNESCO by 2017, but UNESCO finally made the park a part of the Global Geoparks Network in April 2018.

The park has a land area of about 128,000 hectares, spread over 8 districts and 74 villages of Sukabumi Regency.

== Attractions ==
The park is a popular tourist destination? with notable attractions such as Puncak Darma, where the highest point of the park is located, the waterfalls Curug Sodong, Awang, and Cimarinjung, the hill Bukit Panenjoan, the cave Lalay, the beaches Palangpang and Palabuhanratu, and several thermal baths.

== See also ==
- Palabuhanratu
- List of National Geoparks
