= Ujung Genteng =

Village in Sukabumi, West Java, Indonesia

Coordinates: 7°21′02″S 106°25′22″E

Ujung Genteng (Indonesian pronunciation: [ˌud͡ʒʊŋ ɡən̪ˈteŋ]) is a village in an area of Ciletuh Palabuhanratu Geopark the National Geopark in Ciracap District, Sukabumi Regency in West Java, Indonesia, about 80 Kilometers from Sukabumi. Ujung Genteng is famous for its Green Turtle nature reserve, beautiful beaches and waterfalls nearby famous for a turtle conservation of green sea turtle (Chelonia Mydas) a protected animal of our marine fauna.

Despite a 6-hour road journey, 90% of visitors to Ujung Genteng still come from Jakarta and Bandung, who visit the area as this is still the nearest beach to these major cities that is virtually untouched. Its white coral beaches are surrounded by coral reef, where locals dive for Lobsters, one of the main sources of income for the people of the area.

As the area is growing in popularity, tourism is becoming the main source of income for the local population and part of the rich tourist heritage of Indonesia. Plans by the government are already underway to develop and preserve this area for the future. Toll roads virtually complete from Bandung and Jakarta will be completed by 2015.

The Japanese occupied this area as strategic location during the World War II, with Christmas Island directly south and a link to Australia. Relics of their occupation in the area are still well preserved, the old Japanese harbor is broken but still the main landmark, Lookout towers and hidden caves can still be visited and seen at the end of the Ujung Genteng peninsula.

Accommodation are primarily still local style properties that encroach on the conservation area, the area only has one official hotel which is near the boundary bridge of the Conservation area on the road towards Cibuaya.
