= Cimandiri, Banten =

Village in Banten, Indonesia

Cimandiri
- Location in Banten and Indonesia Cimandiri (Indonesia)
- Coordinates: 6°50′46.7988″S 106°11′47.8392″E
- Country: Indonesia
- Province: Banten
- Regency: Lebak Regency
- District: Panggarangan District
- Elevation: 1,043 ft (318 m)

Population (2010)
  - Total: 3,846
- Time zone: UTC+7 (Western Indonesia Time)

Cimandiri (Indonesian pronunciation: [t͡ʃimanˈdiri]) is a village in Panggarangan District, Lebak Regency (in Banten Province) of Indonesia. Its population was 4,477 in mid 2022.

== Climate ==
Cimandiri has a tropical rainforest climate (Af) with heavy to very heavy rainfall year-round.

Climate data for Cimandiri
Month	Jan	Feb	Mar	Apr	May	Jun	Jul	Aug	Sep	Oct	Nov	Dec	Year
Mean daily maximum °C (°F)	29.3 (84.7)	29.6 (85.3)	30.3 (86.5)	30.4 (86.7)	30.6 (87.1)	30.4 (86.7)	30.5 (86.9)	30.7 (87.3)	31.1 (88.0)	31.1 (88.0)	30.7 (87.3)	30.1 (86.2)	30.4 (86.7)
Daily mean °C (°F)	24.9 (76.8)	25.1 (77.2)	25.5 (77.9)	25.6 (78.1)	25.7 (78.3)	25.3 (77.5)	25.0 (77.0)	25.0 (77.0)	25.4 (77.7)	25.7 (78.3)	25.7 (78.3)	25.5 (77.9)	25.4 (77.7)
Mean daily minimum °C (°F)	20.6 (69.1)	20.6 (69.1)	20.7 (69.3)	20.9 (69.6)	20.9 (69.6)	20.2 (68.4)	19.6 (67.3)	19.3 (66.7)	19.8 (67.6)	20.4 (68.7)	20.7 (69.3)	20.9 (69.6)	20.4 (68.7)
Average precipitation mm (inches)	439 (17.3)	382 (15.0)	399 (15.7)	383 (15.1)	301 (11.9)	192 (7.6)	191 (7.5)	193 (7.6)	261 (10.3)	350 (13.8)	497 (19.6)	483 (19.0)	4,071 (160.4)
Source: Climate-Data.org
