= West Jampang =

District in Sukabumi Regency, West Java Province, Indonesia

Coordinates: 7.2579°S 106.6256°E

West Jampang or Jampang Kulon is a town in West Java.It serves as the administrative center of a district of the same name in the Sukabumi Regency.
