= Sukabumi Regency =

Regency in West Java, Indonesia

Sukabumi Regency Kabupaten Sukabumi
- Regency

Regional transcription(s)
  - Sundanese: ᮊᮘᮥᮕᮒᮦᮔ᮪ ᮞᮥᮊᮘᮥᮙᮤ
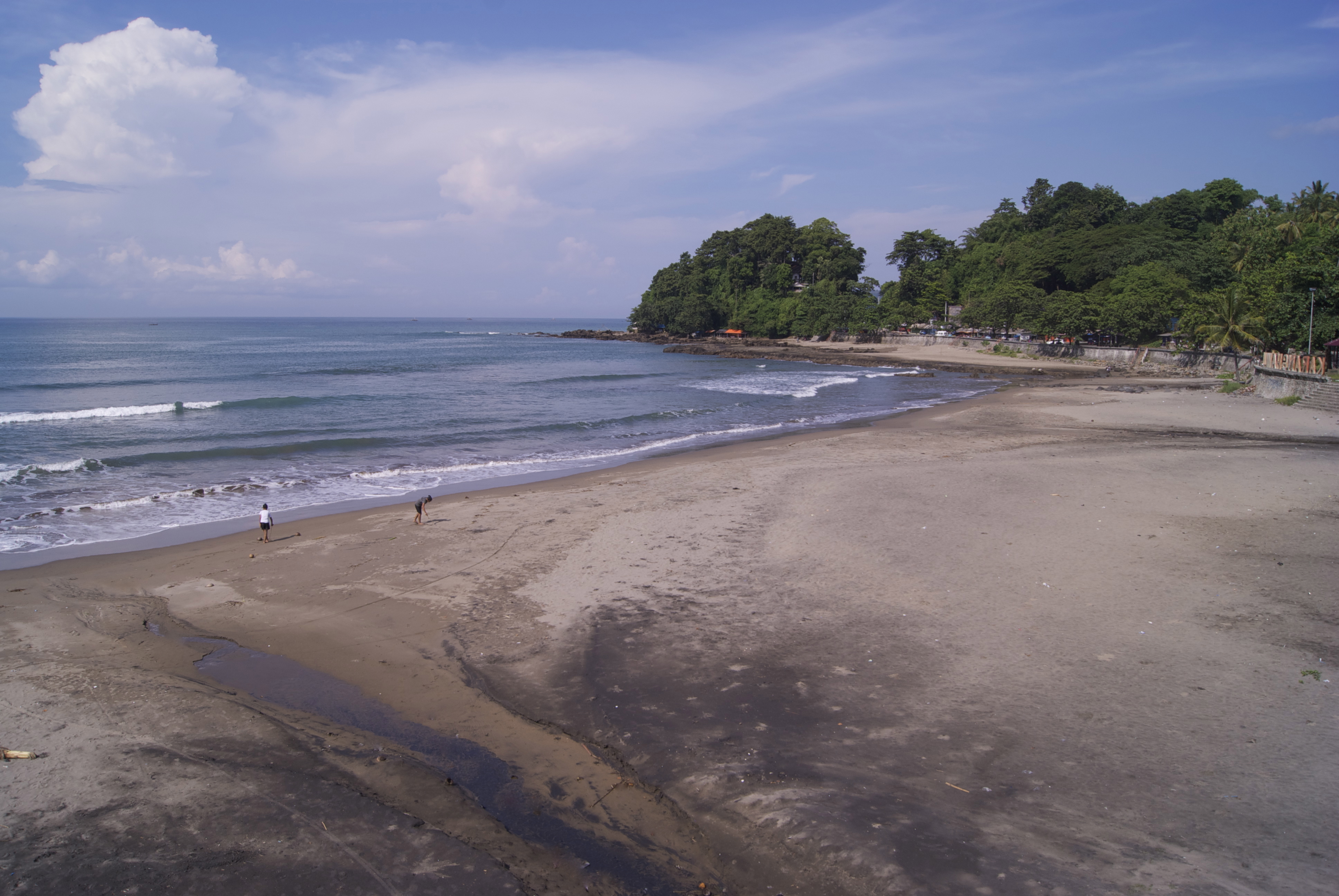
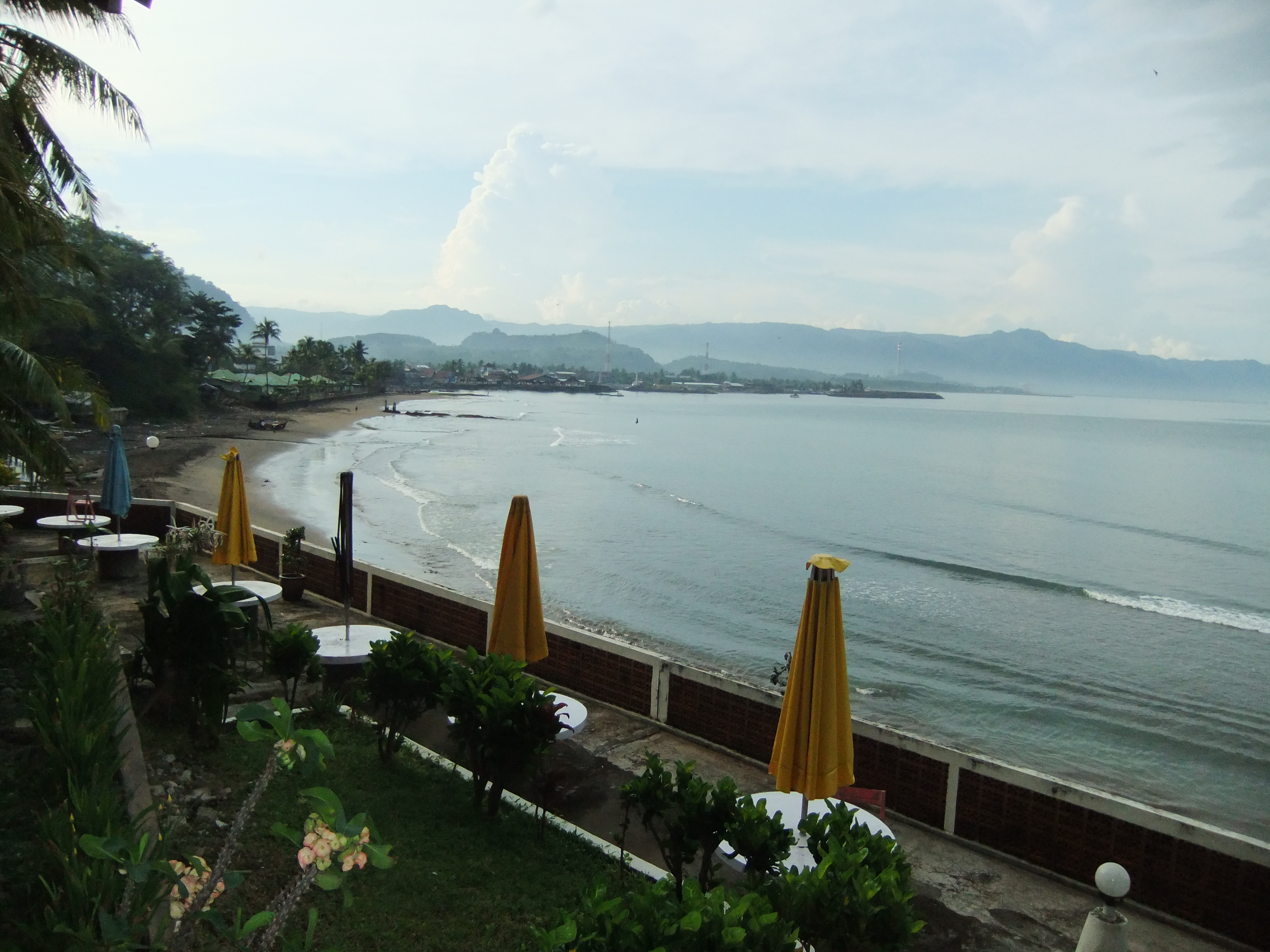
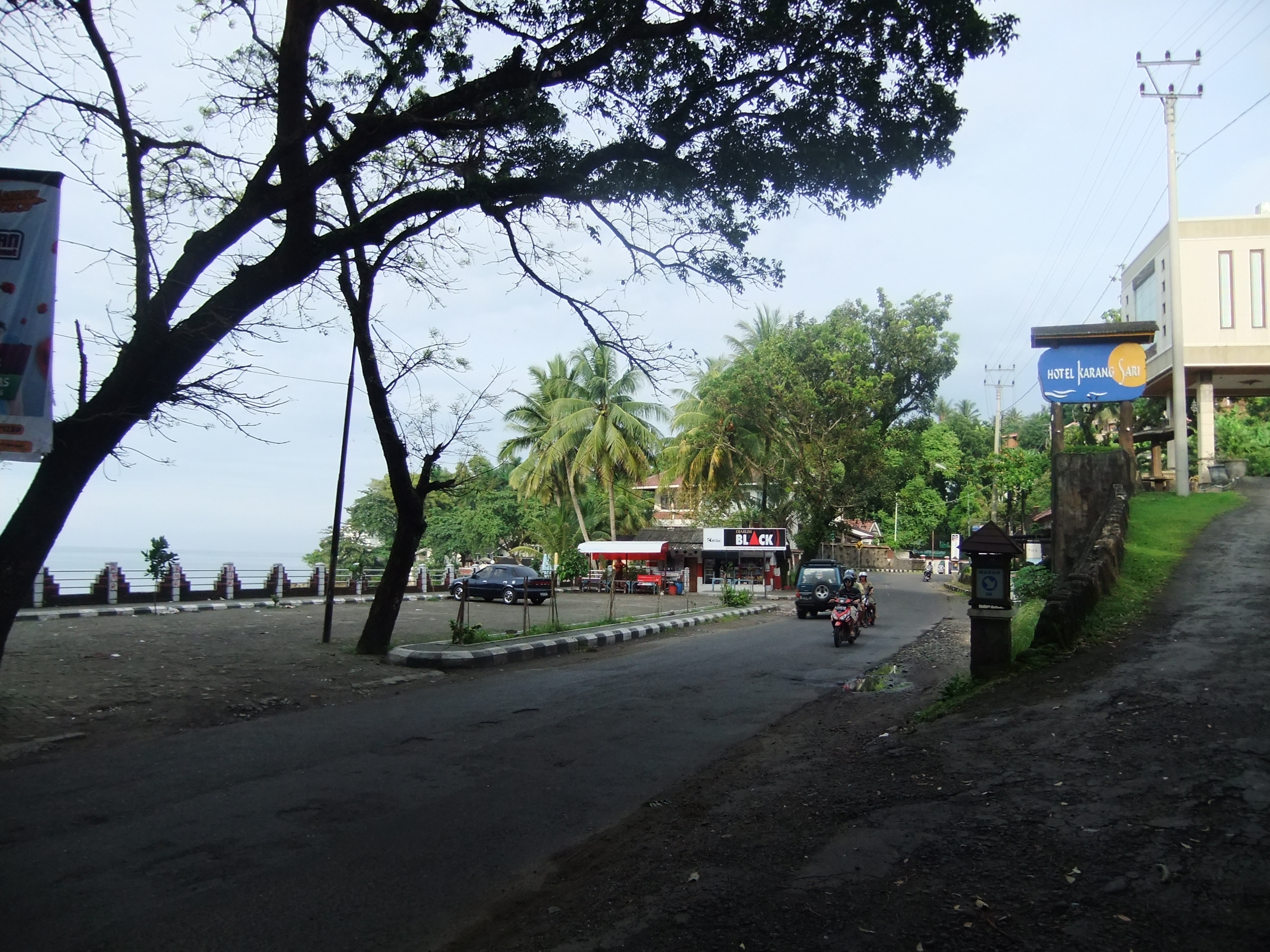
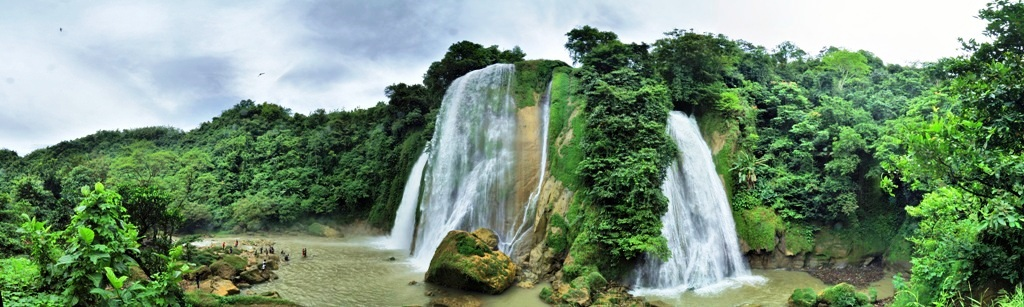
- Clockwise, from top left : Karanghawu Beach, Streetscape of Pelabuhan Ratu, Cikaso waterfall, Pelabuhan Ratu Bay

- Coat of arms
- Motto: Gemah Ripah Loh Jinawi ᮌᮨᮙᮂ ᮛᮤᮕᮂ ᮜᮧᮂ ᮏᮤᮔᮝᮤ Prosperous, Peaceful, Abundantly Fertile
- Location within West Java

- Location in Java and Indonesia Sukabumi Regency (Indonesia)
- Coordinates: 6°59′19″S 106°33′03″E
- Country: Indonesia
- Province: West Java
- Consolidated: 1 June 1921
- Anniversary Day: 1 October 1945
- Regency seat: Palabuhanratu
- Administrative divisions: 47 Districts; 386 Villages

Government
  - Regent: Asep Japar
  - Vice Regent: Andreas

Area
  - Total: 4,163.82 km^{2} (1,607.66 sq mi)
- Highest elevation: 3,019 m (9,905 ft)
- Lowest elevation: 0 m (0 ft)

Population (mid 2025 estimate)
  - Total: 2,852,107
  - Density: 684.974/km^{2} (1,774.07/sq mi)
- Time zone: UTC+7 (Indonesia Western Time)
- Postal code(s): 431xx, 433xx
- Area code: +62 266
- Vehicle registration: F
- HDI: ▲0.644 (Medium)
- Website: sukabumikab.go.id

Sukabumi Regency (Indonesian: Kabupaten Sukabumi, pronounced [kabuˌpat̪ɛn sukaˈbumi]; Sundanese: Kabupatén Sukabumi) is a regency (kabupaten) in southwestern Java, as part of West Java province of Indonesia. The regency seat is located in Palabuhanratu, a coastal district facing the Indian Ocean. The regency fully encircles the administratively separated city of Sukabumi. Covering an area of 4,163.82 km^{2}, the regency is geographically the largest regency in Java island. The regency had a population of 2,341,409 at the 2010 census and 2,725,450 at the 2020 census; the official estimate as at mid 2025 was 2,852,107 (comprising 1,444,445 males and 1,407,662 females), with a large proportion of it living in the northeastern part of the regency that encircles Sukabumi City, south of Mount Gede. A plan to create a new regency, the putative North Sukabumi Regency surrounding Sukabumi city, was considered by the Indonesian government in 2013, but has been deferred until the end of the current moratorium on new creations of regencies.

Sukabumi is strategically located south of Jabodetabek (the Jakarta Metropolitan Area) and west of the Bandung Metro, two largest metropolitan area in Indonesia. Geologically, the regency is at the western end of the Cimandiri Fault, which splits the northern plateau from the southern hilly areas. Its southern region is less populated and contains a high level of biodiversity and significant geological heritage, acknowledged in 2015 by UNESCO with the declaration of Ciletuh-Palabuhanratu Geopark located in the southwestern coast of the regency.

== History ==
=== Early history ===
The area around Sukabumi was already inhabited at least in the 11th century. The first written record found in this area was the Sanghyang Tapak inscription in Cibadak District, 20 km west of Sukabumi. Written in Kawi script, the stone tells about the prohibition of fishing activity in the nearby river by the authorities of the Sunda Kingdom. Another written record found is the undeciphered Pasir Datar Inscription in the Cicantayan District.

After the fall of Sunda Kingdom in 1579, most of present-day Sukabumi Regency was under the control of Sumedang Larang, while the area west of Mount Gede was controlled by the Banten Sultanate. In 1620, King Aria Suriadiwangsa of Sumedang Larang declared his kingdom as part of Mataram Sultanate. During this era, Dipati Ukur, the local ruler of present-day Bandung revolted against Mataram after the failed Siege of Batavia. The revolt triggered migration of people from Sumedang Larang to move and settle the area around Palabuhanratu and Jampang to protect themselves from the approaching Mataram troops.

After Sultan Agung died in 1645, the Priangan region slowly broke away from Mataram influence. In 1674, Trunajaya rebellion started in Madura and greatly weakened Mataram. Sukabumi, which was still a part of Cianjur, declared itself independent from Mataram under the leadership of Wiratanu I in 1677, when Trunajaya forces sacked the Plered Palace in Mataram's capital. The Sultanate itself was officially ceded Priangan region west of Citarum to the VOC on October 20, 1677, by an unequal treaty between Amangkurat II and Maetsuycker, as a compensation for Dutch assistance to quell the Trunajaya rebellion. By that time, there were only few rural Sundanese settlements existed, one of the largest was Cikole. Under the leadership of Sultan Ageng Tirtayasa, Banten tried to reclaim Priangan between 1677 and 1683 via an invasion of Cianjur, however his effort was ultimately failed when Banten descended into civil war between Ageng and his crown prince Abdul Kahhar.

=== Colonial era ===
The inland and coastal areas of Sukabumi were first explored by Europeans at the end of the 17th century, when VOC planned to open plantations throughout Priangan. The first Dutch expedition was led in 1687 by Pieter Scipio van Oostende into the remnant of Pakuan and ended on Wijnkoopsbaai (present-day Palabuhanratu). The next expeditions were led by Adolf Winkler in 1690, and governor-general Abraham van Riebeeck in 1703, 1704, and 1709. In the 1709 expedition Van Riebeeck passed through Mount Gede and visited southern Sukabumi to check on the progress of coffee cultivation in that area. One of the first coffee plantation opened by Van Riebeeck was located in present-day Gunungguruh District. The first coffee harvest was officially sent on April 14, 1711, by Tjiandjoer regent Wiratanu III. In 1723, The coffee plantation areas in Sukabumi were grown, along with the enlargement of Tjiandjoer Regency during the administration of Hendrick Zwaardecroon.

==== Formation ====
The regency was originally carved out from the colonial era-Tjianjoer (i.e. Cianjur) Regency. It was then part of the Priangan Residency (Residentie Preanger Regentschappen). In 1776, the regent of Tjianjoer Wiratanu Datar VI created a kepatihan (viceregency) named Tjikole Viceregency which consisted of the districts of Goenoengparang, Tjimahi, Tjiheoelang, Tjitjoeroeg, Djampangtengah and Djampangkoelon, with its administrative center in Tjikole (now part of Sukabumi).

On January 13, 1815, under the British rule, the Tjikole Viceregency was renamed as Soekaboemi Viceregency. The name Soekaboemi was proposed by a Dutch surgeon and plantation owner named Dr. Andries de Wilde, who owned a plantation and resided in the viceregency. The origin of the name came from the combination of two Sanskrit words, Soeka (happiness, likely) and Boemi (earth, land). Thus Soekaboemi could be translated as "Likable Land".

In 1921, by the decree of Governor General Dirk Fock, Tjiandjoer Regency was divided into two regencies, Tjiandjoer and Soekaboemi regencies, effective from June 1, 1921. The first regent of Soekaboemi was R. A. A. Soerianatabrata, who also held position as Sukabumi's last viceregent. He held this position until 1930. From 1926 to 1931, Soekaboemi served as the capital of the short-lived West Priangan Residency.

== Geography ==
The regency borders the Cianjur Regency in the east, Bogor Regency in the north, Lebak Regency (of Banten Province) in the west, and the Indian Ocean in the south.

=== Beaches ===
Along the southern coast of the regency there are several beaches such as Pasir Putih Beach (Cipanarikan estuary), Pangumbahan Beach (also known as Turtle Beach), Cibuaya Beach and Ujunggenteng Beach. Batununggul Beach is suitable for surfing with average wave height approximately 3 meters in dry season, but only 1 meter in rainy season.

=== Waterfalls ===
The 120-meters Caweni Waterfall is located only 200 metres from Cidolog road, about 70 kilometres south of Sukabumi and about 25 kilometres from Sagaranten District.

The Cikaso Waterfall (Ciniti Waterfall) is located in Jampang Kulon district, 1.5 hours drive (70 kilometres) from Sukabumi City. The waterfall height is 80 metres; it consists of 3 waterfalls, from left to right Asepan Waterfall, Meong Waterfall and Aki Waterfall.

== Culture ==
Sukabumi, with Cianjur, is a part of the western Parahyangan cultural region, a fertile mountainous region of West Java which is home to the Sundanese people.

=== Traditional festivities ===
The local people hold the Ocean Fiesta every year on 5 April in Pelabuhan Ratu Beach. There is also Ngabungbang tradition in Cisukawayana river estuary on every full moon of each month in early morning. Ngabungbang or Mass ritual bath is a pre-Islamic tradition since 175-205 BC when King Hyang Brahma ruled Medang Gali (Galuh) Kingdom and continued by Prabu Siliwangi from Sunda Kingdom until now.

== Government ==
=== Politics ===
Sukabumi's current regent, Marwan Hamami, is on his second term, having been elected in 2015 and 2020. The municipal legislature seats 50 members, with Golkar having the largest number of seats as of the 2024 election.

=== Administrative districts ===
As at 2025, Sukabumi Regency is divided into forty-seven districts (kecamatan), listed below with their areas and their populations at the 2010 census and the 2020 census, together with the official estimates as at mid 2025. These exclude the further seven districts which are within the city of Sukabumi (and thus administratively outside the regency). The fourteen districts in the south of the regency are listed first, followed by the nine districts in the centre (outside of the putative "Subabumi Utara" Regency), but these geographical groupings have no official status. The table also includes the locations of the district administrative centres, the number of villages in each district (totaling 381 rural desa and 5 urban kelurahan), and its postal code.

Kode Wilayah	Name of District (kecamatan)	Area in km^{2}	Pop'n 2010 census	Pop'n 2020 census	Pop'n mid 2025 estimate	Admin centre ^{(a)}	No. of villages	Post code
32.02.22	Ciemas ^{(b)}	304.46	48,081	55,837	58,341	Tamanjaya	9	43177
32.02.26	Ciracap	148.52	47,495	56,073	59,057	Ciracap	8	43176
32.02.20	Waluran	98.81	25,951	30,788	32,503	Waluran	6	43175
32.02.24	Surade	119.33	72,083	82,173	85,091	Surade	12 ^{(c)}	43179
32.02.25	Cibitung	88.83	25,066	29,766	31,438	Cibitung	6	43172
32.02.21	Jampang Kulon	62.58	41,396	47,498	49,340	Jampang Kulon	11 ^{(c)}	43170
32.02.46	Cimanggu	62.57	22,104	26,214	27,669	Cimanggu	6	43178
32.02.23	Kalibunder	86.07	27,175	31,758	33,283	Kalibunder	7	43185
32.02.45	Tegalbuleud	255.52	33,443	36,550	37,084	Tegalbuleud	8	43186
32.02.43	Cidolog	95.72	17,518	17,607	17,154	Mekarjaya	5	43184
32.02.41	Sagaranten	113.01	47,309	53,198	54,723	Sagaranten	12	43181
32.02.44	Cidadap	85.80	18,663	19,877	19,917	Padasenang	6	43183
32.02.42	Curugkembar	55.86	28,463	31,322	31,885	Curugkembar	7	43182
32.02.37	Pabuaran	115.69	39,590	44,621	45,952	Pabuaran	7	43173
Sub-totals	Southern group	1,693.77	494,307	563,282	583,437		110	
32.02.07	Lengkong	146.50	29,222	33,436	34,685	Lengkong	5	43174
32.02.01	Palabuhanratu	91.76	96,675	115,813	122,840	Palabuhanratu	10 ^{(c)}	43364
32.02.02	Simpenan	167.92	48,281	57,978	61,567	Cidadap	7	43361
32.02.09	Warungkiara	94.96	55,045	65,266	68,882	Warungkiara	12	43362
32.02.04	Bantargadung	76.00	35,234	41,319	43,376	Bojonggaling	7	43363
32.02.08	Jampang Tengah	198.47	63,012	71,007	73,119	Jampang Tengah	11	43171
32.02.38	Purabaya	116.01	39,486	44,816	46,309	Purabaya	7	43187
32.02.10	Cikembar	89.83	79,303	94,692	100,278	Cikembar	10	43157
32.02.39	Nyalindung	104.37	46,167	52,357	54,080	Nyalindung	10	43196
Sub-totals	Central group	1,085.82	492,425	576,684	605,136		79	
32.02.40	Gegerbitung *	67.64	36,511	42,383	44,275	Gegerbitung	7	43197 ^{(d)}
32.02.33	Sukaraja *	42.00	77,015	94,057	100,699	Sukaraja	9	43192
32.02.34	Kebonpedes *	10.83	27,097	33,505	35,086	Kebonpedes	5	43194
32.02.35	Cireunghas *	30.72	31,359	36,160	37,652	Cireunghas	5	43193
32.02.36	Sukalarang *	30.90	41,777	50,559	53,891	Cimangkok	6	43191
32.02.32	Sukabumi (district) *	29.91	46,251	51,505	52,733	Warnasari	6	43151
32.02.30	Kadudampit *	69.98	50,319	58,687	61,446	Kadudampit	9	43153
32.02.29	Cisaat *	21.49	113,929	129,643	134,130	Cisaat	13	43152 ^{(e)}
32.02.27	Gunungguruh *	26.31	48,099	56,764	59,773	Gunung Guruh	7	43156
Sub-totals	North-eastern group	329.78	472,357	553,263	580,685		67	
32.02.11	Cibadak *	63.05	107,623	122,288	126,431	Cibadak	10 ^{(c)}	43351
32.02.28	Cicantayan *	34.90	52,716	60,990	63,609	Cicantayan	8	43155
32.02.31	Caringin *	36.54	43,258	51,235	54,045	Caringin Wetan	9	43154
32.02.12	Nagrak *	71.18	77,782	90,297	94,336	Nagrak Selatan	10	43352
32.02.47	Ciambar *	53.46	36,771	43,253	45,474	Ciambar	6	43356
32.02.16	Cicurug *	52.16	123,088	137,019	140,262	Cicurug	13 ^{(c)}	43359
32.02.17	Cidahu *	35.30	60,567	74,010	79,257	Jayabakti	8	43358
32.02.15	Parakansalak *	36.88	39,409	45,911	48,043	Parakansalak	6	43355
32.02.13	Parungkuda *	24.01	69,224	78,035	80,369	Sundawenang	8	43357
32.02.14	Bojonggenteng *	20.37	34,900	40,533	42,352	Bojonggenteng	5	43353
Sub-totals	North-central group	427.95	645,338	743,571	774,178		83	
32.02.18	Kalapanunggal *	49.37	44,587	52,731	55,583	Kalapanunggal	7	43354
32.02.06	Cikidang	155.00	55,863	68,841	74,024	Cikidang	12	43367
32.02.05	Cisolok	173.46	62,076	76,235	81,838	Cisolok	13	43366
32.02.03	Cikakak	113.13	37,400	45,316	48,330	Sukamaju	9	43365
32.02.19	Kabandungan *	136.66	37,036	45,527	48,896	Kabandungan	6	43368
Sub-totals	North-west group	627.62	236,962	288,650	308,671		47	
	Totals for regency	4,163.82	2,341,409	2,725,450	2,852,107	Palabuhanratu	386	

Notes: (a) Of the 47 district capitals, 5 are classed as urban kelurahan (Surade, Palabuhanratu, Cibadak, Cicurug and Jampang Kulon) while the other 42 are rated as rural desa. These 5 are the only kelurahan in the regency.
(b) Ciemas District includes five small offshore islands - Pulau Gotor, Pulau Karanghantu, Pulau Kunti, Pulau Mandra and Pulau Manuk.
(c) including one kelurahan (the district administrative centre). (d) except the village of Caringin, with a post code of 43154.
(e) except the village of Nagrak, with a post code of 43132, and the village of Sukasari, with a post code of 43134.
The creation of a new North Sukabumi Regency (Kabupaten Sukabumi Utara), a proposal under consideration by the Indonesian Parliament since 2013 but currently deferred, would comprise 21 of the above 47 districts from the existing Sukabumi Regency. These 21 districts are indicated by asterisks (*) in the above table. They are sub-divided into 161 desa and kelurahan, and cover an area of 911.55 km^{2}, with 1,395,092 inhabitants at the 2020 Census and 1,447,140 as at mid 2024.
