= Sukabumi =

City in West Java, Indonesia

- City
- City of Sukabumi; Kota Sukabumi

Other transcription(s)
  - Sundanese: ᮓᮚᮩᮂ ᮞᮥᮊᮘᮥᮙᮤ
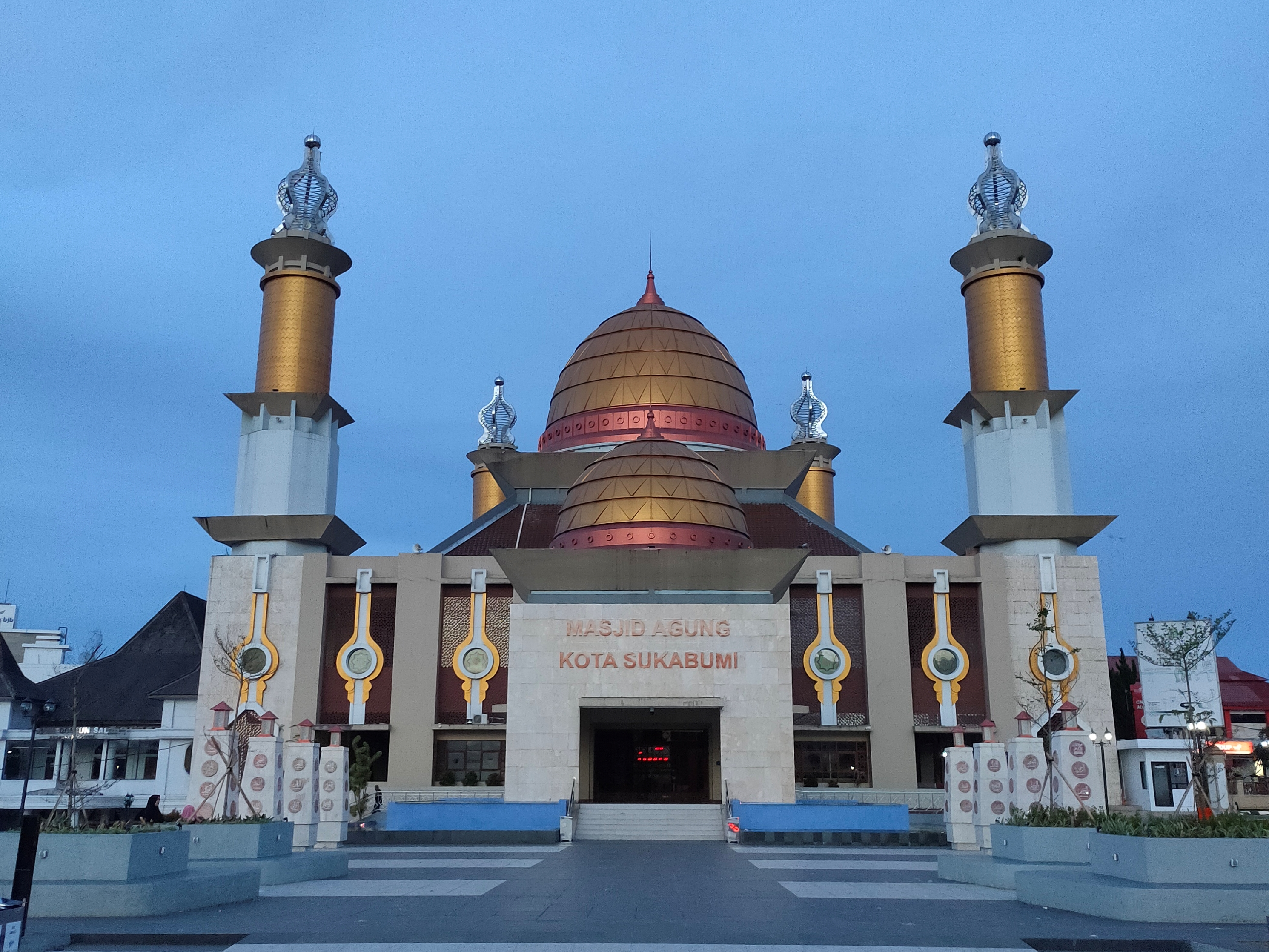
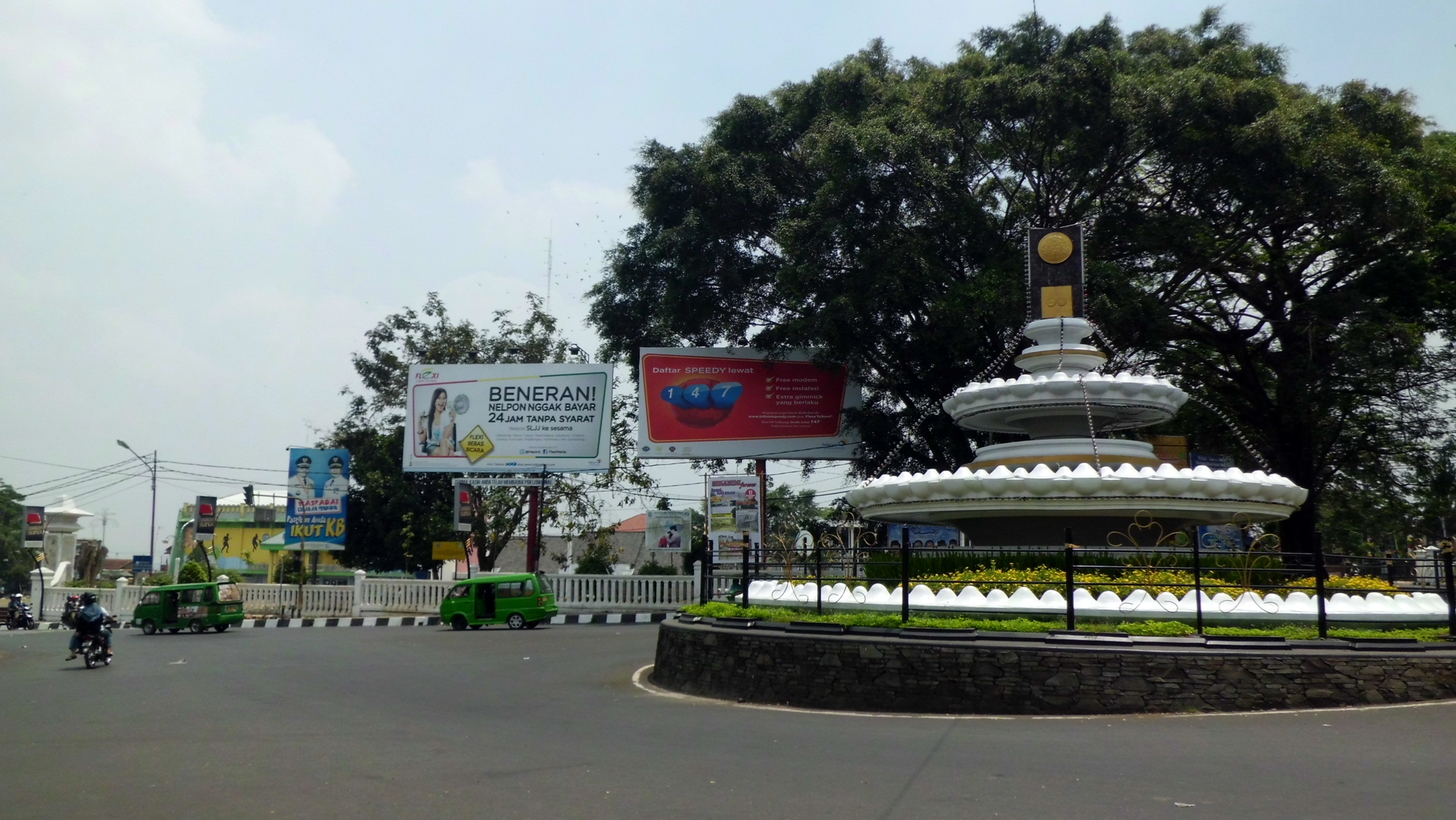
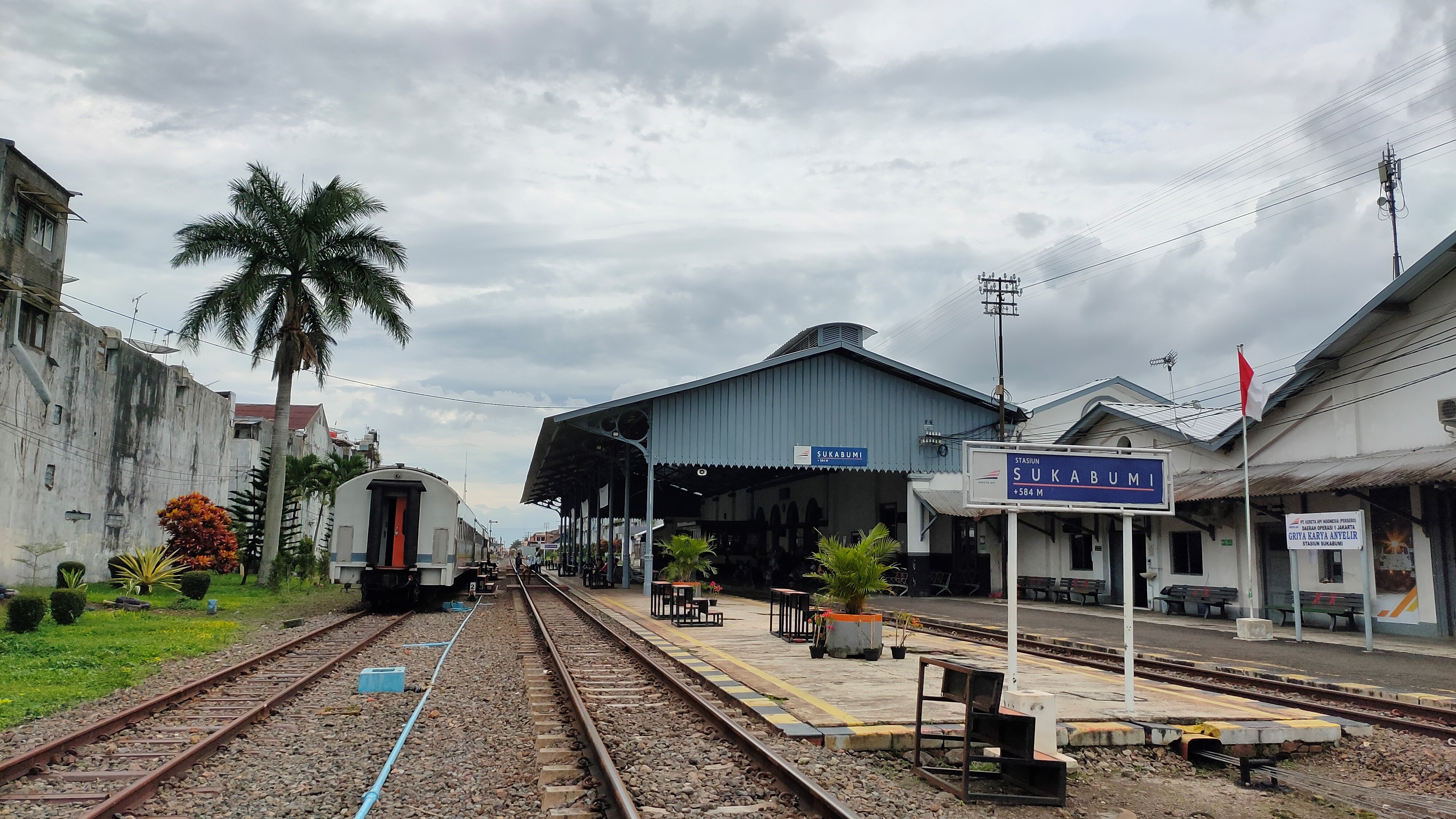
- Clockwise from top: Great Mosque of Sukabumi, Sukabumi railway station, Alun-alun Sukabumi

- Flag Coat of arms
- Nickname: Kota Santri "City of Islamic learners"
- Motto: Reugreug, Pageuh, Répéh, Rapih (Sundanese) ᮛᮩᮌᮢᮩᮌ᮪, ᮕᮌᮩᮂ, ᮦᮛᮦᮕᮂ, ᮛᮕᮤᮂ Adamant, Firm, Convenient, Harmonious
- Location within West Java

- Location in Java and Indonesia Sukabumi City (Indonesia)
- Coordinates: 6°55′05″S 106°55′53″E
- Country: Indonesia
- Province: West Java
- Settled: 1709
- Consolidated: 1 April 1914 (as Gemeente Soekaboemi)

Government
  - Body: Sukabumi Municipal Government
  - Mayor: Ayep Zaki
  - Vice Mayor: Bobby Maulana

Area
  - Total: 48.31 km^{2} (18.65 sq mi)
  - Water: 4.815 km^{2} (1.859 sq mi)
- Elevation: 584 m (1,916 ft)

Population (mid 2025 estimate)
  - Total: 370,680
  - Rank: 37th, Indonesia
  - Density: 7,673/km^{2} (19,870/sq mi)
- Demonym: Sukabuminese
- Time zone: UTC+7 (Indonesia Western Time)
- Postcodes: 431xx
- Area code: (+62)266
- Registration plate: F
- HDI: ▲0.742 (High)
- Website: sukabumikota.go.id

Sukabumi (Sundanese: ᮞᮥᮊᮘᮥᮙᮤ) is a landlocked city surrounded by the regency of the same name (within which it is an enclave) in the southern foothills of Mount Gede, in West Java, Indonesia, about 100 km (62 mi) south of the national capital, Jakarta.

At an altitude of approximately 584 m (1,916 ft), the city is a minor hill station resort, with a cooler climate than the surrounding lowlands. The area around Sukabumi is also a popular destination for whitewater rafting. Tea and rubber production is a major industry in the area. The suburban area surrounding Sukabumi circling the mountain has grown tremendously in population, such that northern Sukabumi Regency, hugging the volcano, and bordering Greater Jakarta, is home to the bulk of the regency's population.

The area of the city is 48.31 km^{2}, and the population at the 2010 Census was 300,359, while the 2020 Census was 346,325; the official estimate as at mid 2025 was 370,680 (comprising 186,130 males and 184,550 females). However, another 1,459,342 people, as at the mid 2025 official estimates, live in the surrounding metropolitan area within Sukabumi Regency, notably in Cisaat and Gunungguruh Districts to the west of the city and Kebonpedes District to the east, all three being suburbs within the built-up area. The bulk of the metropolitan area population is unusual in that it forms a narrow southwest ring around Mount Gede. The eastern portion of the ringed population belt continues into Cianjur Regency.

== History ==
=== Early history ===
The area around Sukabumi was already inhabited at least in the 11th century. The first written record found in this area was the Sanghyang Tapak inscription in Cibadak, 20 km west of the city. Written in Kawi script, the stone tells about the prohibition of fishing activity in the nearby river by the authorities of the Sunda Kingdom.

At the end of the 16th century, the area was captured by the Banten Sultanate, after the fall of the Sunda Kingdom. The area, however, became contested in the 1620s between Banten, the Mataram Sultanate in the east and the Batavia-based Dutch East India Company. After a series of military clashes between them, the area was included in a buffer zone territory between Banten and Mataram, although the area is considered de jure as a part of Mataram.

In 1677, after the Dutch forced Mataram to sign a series of unequal treaties as a consequence of Dutch assistance for quelling the Trunajaya rebellion, Sukabumi came under direct control of Tjiandjoer. By that time, there were only few rural Sundanese settlements existed, one of the largest was Tjikole.

=== Colonial Sukabumi ===
==== Sukabumi Coffee Plantations ====
The area around the present-day Sukabumi (or Soekaboemi in Van Ophuijsen Spelling System) began to develop in the 18th century when the Dutch East India Company started to open coffee plantation areas in the western Priangan region of Java. Due to the high demands of coffee in Europe, in the year of 1709 the Dutch governor-general Abraham van Riebeeck started to open coffee plantations around the area of Tjibalagoeng (present-day Bogor), Tjiandjoer, Djogdjogan, Pondok Kopo, and Goenoeng Goeroeh. Coffee plantations in these five areas had then undergone expansion and intensification during the era of Hendrick Zwaardecroon (1718–1725), where the Tjiandjoer regent at that time Wira Tanoe III acquired territorial expansion of his regency as a compensation for more coffee plantations openings.

The growth of the Goenoeng Goeroeh (Gunungguruh) coffee plantation led to the establishment of small settlements around its area, one of which was the Tjikole (Cikole) hamlet, named after the nearby Tjikole River. In 1776, regent of Tjiandjoer Wira Tanoe Datar VI established the Tjikole Viceregency which was the indirect predecessor of the present-day Sukabumi Regency. The viceregency consisted of six districts of Djampang Koelon, Djampang Tengah, Goenoeng Parang, Tjiheoelang, Tjimahi, and Tjitjoeroeg. The administrative center was located in Tjikole, due to its very strategic location for communications between Batavia and Tjiandjoer, which was the capital of the Priangan Residency at that time.

==== Tjikole becomes Soekaboemi ====
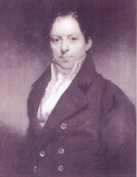
Andries de Wilde proposed the renaming of Tjikole to Soekaboemi to the Raffles administration

After the Dutch East Indies were under the rule of the British in 1811, vast lands in the Tjikole area were bought by Stamford Raffles, the Governor-General of the Dutch East Indies at that time, via an auction held in Batavia. The name Soekaboemi was first used on 1815, when a Priangan-based plantation owner (known then as Preanger Planter) and surgeon, Andries de Wilde visited Tjikole in 1814. From his consultations with local people, De Wilde wrote a letter to Nicolaus Engelhard, a friend and plantation investor, where de Wilde asked Engelhard to propose a name change of the viceregency from Tjikole to Soekaboemi, to which Raffles agreed.

In Dutch colonial times, Soekaboemi was the site of the Politieschool, the colonial police academy. On 8 December 1941, the Empire of Japan invaded the Dutch East Indies as part of World War II and on 6 March 1942, the city came under aerial bombardment by Japanese aircraft. During this attack, both civilian targets (including houses and two schools) and strategic targets (the police academy, the railway line, and the radio station) were hit, resulting in many casualties. During the Japanese occupation, Soekaboemi became the meeting place of Mohammad Hatta and Sutan Sjahrir with representatives of the Japanese Empire to discuss the future of the Dutch East Indies, but both were given 'city prisoner' status. Soekaboemi also became one of the detention sites of American and Australian prisoners of war.

Also during the occupation, the Japanese created a strategic garrison in Ujung Genteng, part of the South Sukabumi Regency. Remains of the harbor and lookout towers at the end of this peninsula are still in place, along with the caves where the Japanese lived and died towards the end of the war. Ujung Genteng is directly North of Christmas Island and Australia and would have made an excellent point of defense or attack. Without official records to substantiate this, it is presumed that they had their sights on Christmas Island and a close link to Australia.

=== Present day ===
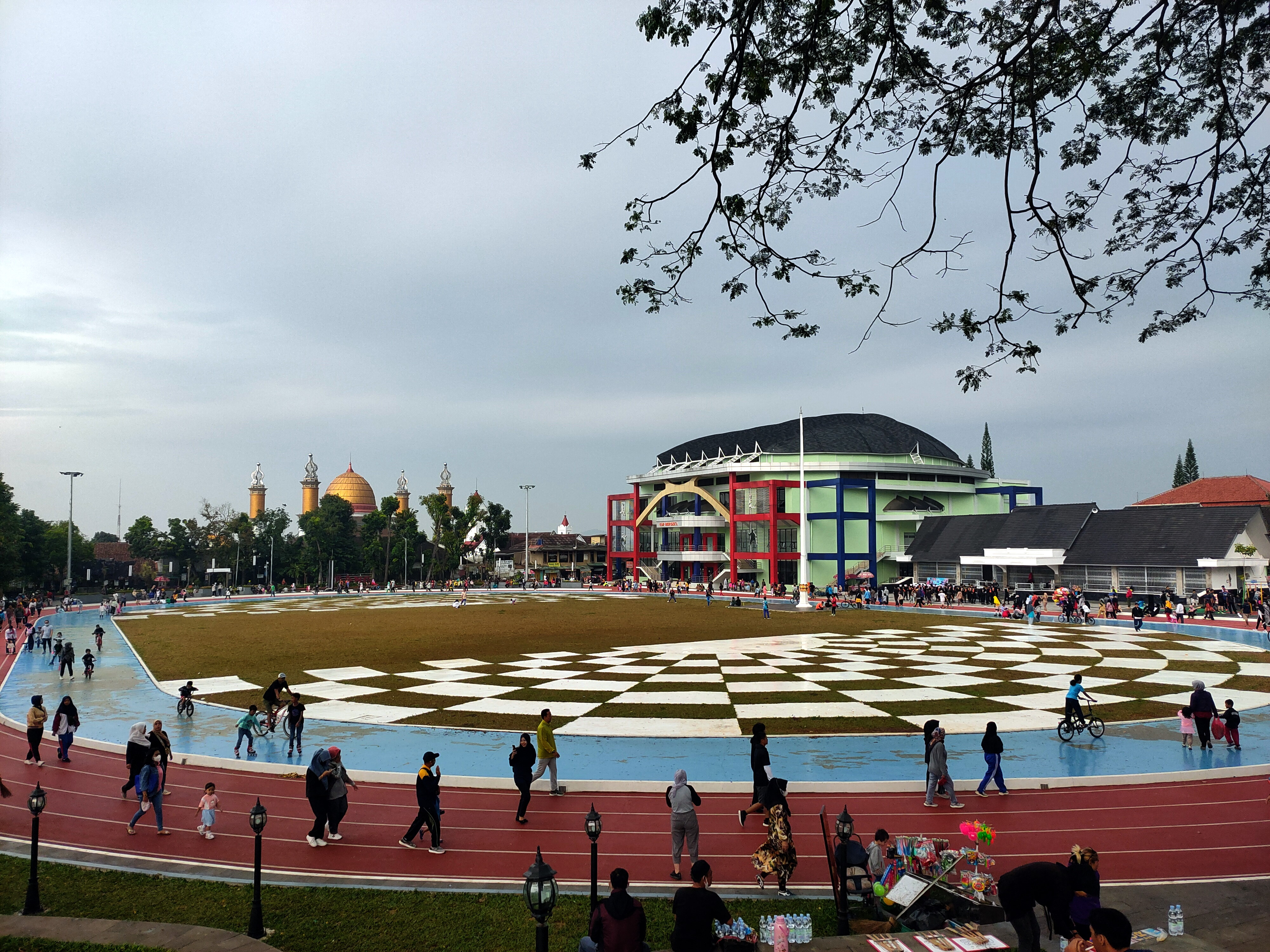
Merdeka field

In early 2005, Sukabumi Regency became the first place in Indonesia where polio was reported in ten years, the beginning of a nationwide outbreak of the disease which had been believed to be eradicated in the country.

== Government and politics ==
=== Administrative districts ===
Administrative map of Sukabumi

The city of Sukabumi is divided into seven districts (kecamatan), listed below with their areas and their populations at the 2010 Census and the 2020 Census, together with the official estimates as of 2025. The table also includes the number of administrative villages (all classed as urban kelurahan) in each district, and its postal codes.

| Kpode Wilayah | Name of District (kecamatan) | Area in km^{2} | Pop'n 2010 Census | Pop'n 2020 Census | Pop'n mid 2025 Estimate | No. of kelurahan | Post codes |
|---|---|---|---|---|---|---|---|
| 32.72.05 | Baros | 5.58 | 29,536 | 37,734 | 42,260 | 4 | 43161 - 43166 |
| 32.72.06 | Lembursitu | 10.70 | 33,719 | 41,432 | 45,540 | 5 | 43134 - 43169 |
| 32.72.07 | Cibeureum | 9.13 | 34,719 | 44,961 | 50,690 | 4 | 43142 - 43165 |
| 32.72.03 | Citamiang | 4.00 | 47,580 | 53,049 | 55,630 | 5 | 43141 - 43145 |
| 32.72.04 | Warudoyong | 7.56 | 52,780 | 58,972 | 61,930 | 5 | 43131 - 43135 |
| 32.72.01 | Gunungpuyuh | 5.13 | 43,622 | 48,292 | 50,460 | 4 | 43121 - 43123 |
| 32.72.06 | Cikole | 6.21 | 56,775 | 61,885 | 64,180 | 6 | 43111 - 43116 |
| Total for | City | 48.31 | 300,359 | 346,325 | 370,680 | 33 | |
| 32.02.34 | Kebonpedes (a) | 10.83 | 27,097 | 33,505 | 36,086 | 5 | 43194 |
| 32.02.27 | Gunungguruh (a) | 26.31 | 48,099 | 56,764 | 59,773 | 7 | 43156 |
| 32.02.29 | Cisaat (a) | 21.49 | 113,929 | 129,643 | 134,130 | 13 | 43152 ^{(b)} |
| Total for | Built-up area | 106.94 | 489,484 | 566,237 | 600,679 | 58 | |

Notes: (a) administrative district of Sukabumi Regency, outside the boundaries of the city proper.
(b) except the village of Nagrak, with a post code of 43132, and the village of Sukasari, with a post code of 43134.

== Climate ==
Sukabumi has an elevation moderated tropical rainforest climate (Köppen Af) with moderate rainfall from July to September and heavy rainfall in the remaining months.

Climate data for Sukabumi
| Month | Jan | Feb | Mar | Apr | May | Jun | Jul | Aug | Sep | Oct | Nov | Dec | Year |
|---|---|---|---|---|---|---|---|---|---|---|---|---|---|
| Mean daily maximum °C (°F) | 27.7 (81.9) | 27.9 (82.2) | 28.7 (83.7) | 28.5 (83.3) | 28.9 (84.0) | 28.5 (83.3) | 28.8 (83.8) | 29.1 (84.4) | 29.7 (85.5) | 29.6 (85.3) | 29.0 (84.2) | 28.2 (82.8) | 28.7 (83.7) |
| Daily mean °C (°F) | 23.2 (73.8) | 23.3 (73.9) | 23.7 (74.7) | 23.7 (74.7) | 23.9 (75.0) | 23.1 (73.6) | 23.0 (73.4) | 23.0 (73.4) | 23.7 (74.7) | 23.9 (75.0) | 23.8 (74.8) | 23.5 (74.3) | 23.5 (74.3) |
| Mean daily minimum °C (°F) | 18.8 (65.8) | 18.7 (65.7) | 18.8 (65.8) | 19.0 (66.2) | 18.9 (66.0) | 17.8 (64.0) | 17.3 (63.1) | 17.0 (62.6) | 17.7 (63.9) | 18.3 (64.9) | 18.6 (65.5) | 18.9 (66.0) | 18.3 (65.0) |
| Average rainfall mm (inches) | 304 (12.0) | 256 (10.1) | 317 (12.5) | 305 (12.0) | 229 (9.0) | 130 (5.1) | 117 (4.6) | 118 (4.6) | 118 (4.6) | 234 (9.2) | 348 (13.7) | 330 (13.0) | 2,806 (110.4) |
Source: Climate-Data.org

== Transportation ==
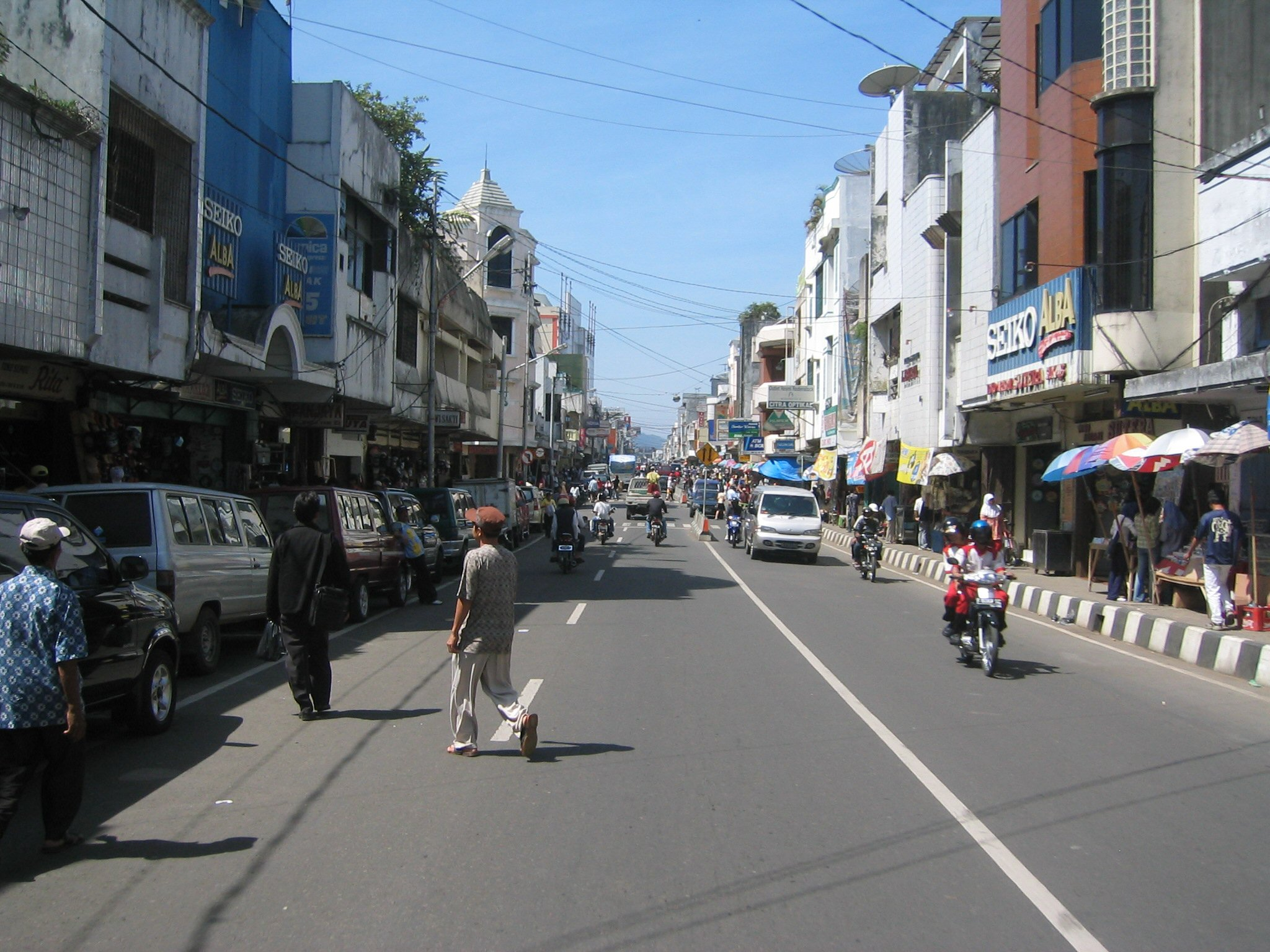
Ahmad Yani Street

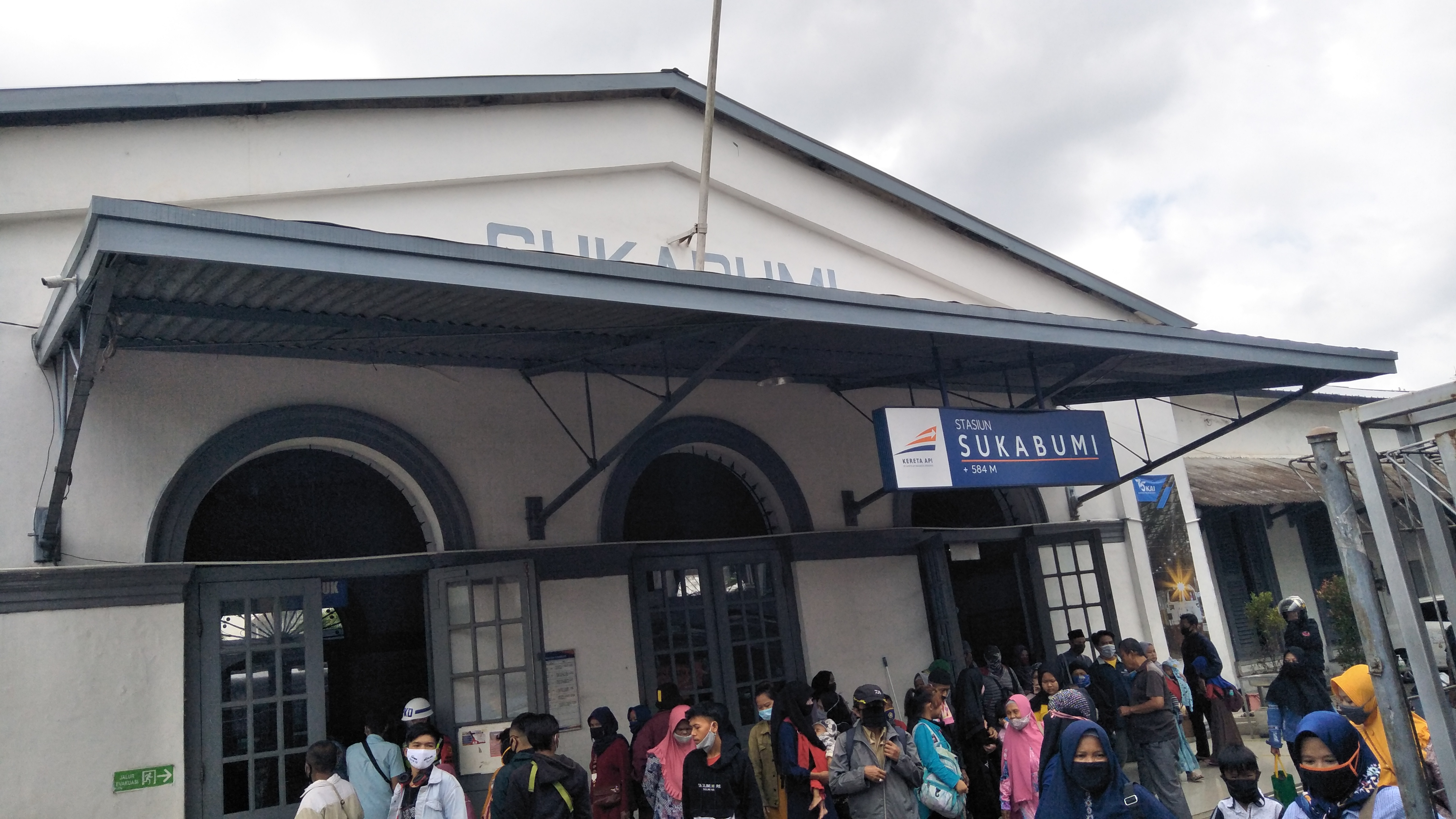
Sukabumi railway station

Sukabumi is connected via roads & railway. The city lies at the junction between Bogor, Cianjur, and southern districts of Sukabumi Regency such as Palabuhanratu, Tegal Buleud and West Jampang. The main intercity bus terminal is Ahmad Sanusi Bus Terminal located in Baros district about 5 km south of city center, while Sukabumi railway station is the only railway station located in the city, in Cikole district near the city center. The most dominant public transport mode available in the city is angkot and ride hailing services provided by Gojek, Grab, InDrive and Maxim.

After almost one year of hiatus, the regional railway transport between Sukabumi and Bogor of 57 kilometers was reactivated, with the new train called 'Pangrango' on 9 November 2013. The train has one executive-class car and three economy-class cars. The 67 kilometers railway transport between Sukabumi, Cianjur and Cipatat in West Bandung Regency is served by 'Siliwangi' train starting from 2016 with only economy-class cars available.

Bogor–Ciawi–Sukabumi Toll Road is a toll road under construction that will connect southern Bogor Regency, Bogor city, northern Sukabumi Regency and Sukabumi city. The 15.35-kilometer first section of the toll road between Ciawi and Cigombong was inaugurated by Indonesian President Joko Widodo on 3 December 2018. Five years later, the 11.9 kilometer second section between Cigombong and Parungkuda was then inaugurated on 4 August 2023. The third section is expected to be fully operational in September 2026.

== Culinary ==
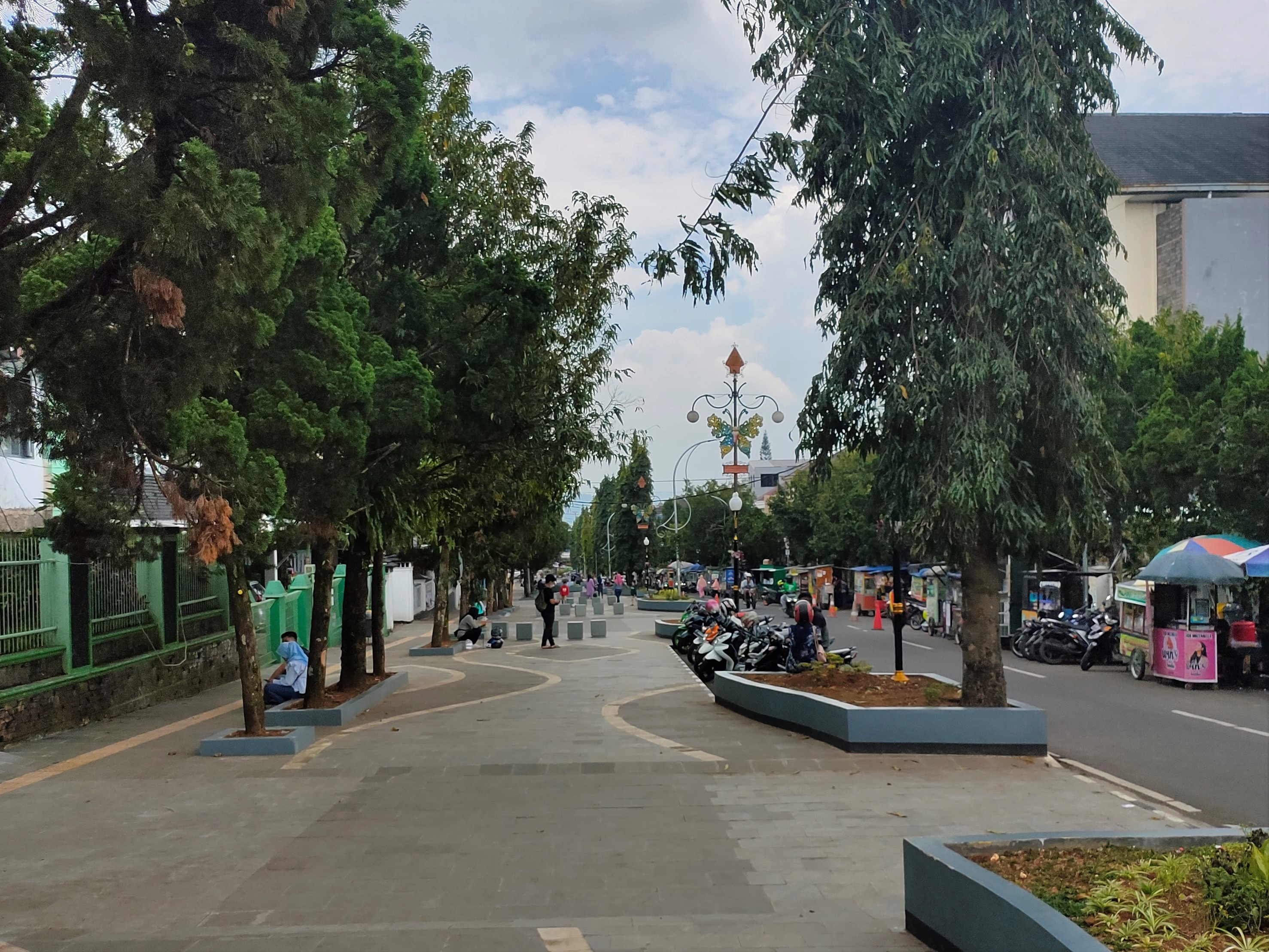
Dago Pedestrian zone, a street notable for its culinary scene

Sukabumi also has some traditional dishes that are worth trying, for example, Roti Priangan, Mochi, Bandros, Soto Mie and Bubur ayam.

== Notable people ==
- Miel Mundt (1880–1949), football player
- Rie Cramer (1887–1977), author and illustrator
- Piet Metman (1916–1990), swimmer
- Lo van Hensbergen (1917–1987), actor and director
- Ellen Beerthuis-Roos (born 1926), sculptor
- Desy Ratnasari (born 1973), actress, singer and politician
- Happy Salma (born 1980), actress, writer, designer, entrepreneur and Balinese royal
- Syahrini (born 1980), actress and singer
