= Raden Gupolo =

Gupolo, guardian of Sewu temple, sculpture (780 - 790 AD) near Prambanan, Central Java, in an albumen photo print by Isidore Von Kinsbergen (circa 1863-1868)

Gupolo (Javanese: ꦒꦸꦥꦭ, romanized: Gupala) is a guardian figure at the Sewu Buddhist temple near Prambanan in Java, Indonesia. It is an example of a Dvarapala figure. According to legend, Prambanan was ruled by a giant king called Ratu Boko who had a daughter Princess Jonggrang, and an adopted son Raden Gupolo whose father had been killed on orders from the king of Pengging.

According to another version of the legend about the ancient kingdoms of Pengging and Boko, Boko was ruled by a cruel man-eating giant named Prabu Boko, supported by another giant Patih Gupolo. Despite his unpleasant nature, Prabu Boko had a beautiful daughter named Rara Jonggrang. Prabu Boko is killed in an attack on Pengging and Patih Gupolo, his assistant, leads his armies away from the battlefield in defeat. Returning to Boko Palace, Patih Gupolo tells Princess Rara Jonggrang of the death of her father. The princess is heartbroken, but before she can recover from her grief the Pengging army besieges and captures the palace. Prince Bandung Bondowoso is mesmerized by the beauty of the mourning princess and proposes marriage, but his offer is swiftly rejected. Bandung Bondowoso insists on the union, and finally, Rara Jonggrang agrees on two impossible conditions: first the prince must build a well-named Jalatunda, and second, he must construct a thousand temples in only one night.

The lovestruck prince agrees and immediately starts work on the well. Using his supernatural powers once again, the prince swiftly finishes construction and proudly displays his work for the princess. As a trick, she urges him to enter the well and when he does so, Patih Gupolo piles stones into it and buries him alive. With great effort Bandung Bondowoso escapes, but his love for the princess is so strong that he forgives her the attempt on his life.

== See also ==
- Agastya
- Rara Jonggrang (legend)
