= Roro Jonggrang =

Javanese folk tale

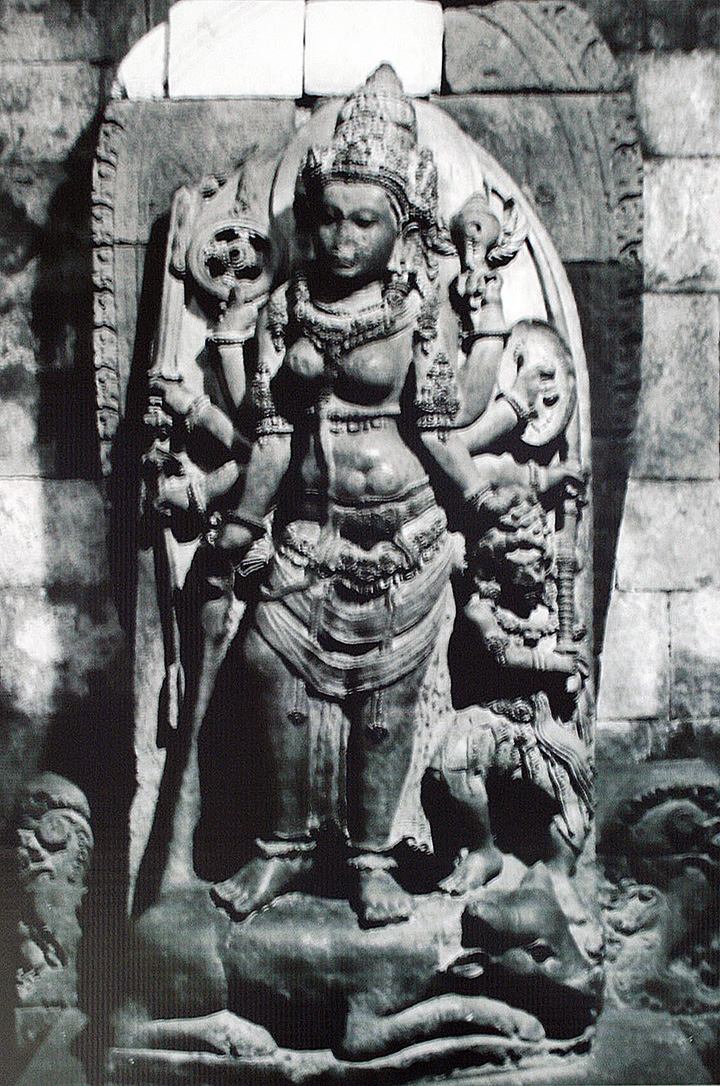
The statue of Durga Mahisasuramardini in the northern cella of Shiva temple, thought to be Princess Rara Jonggrang

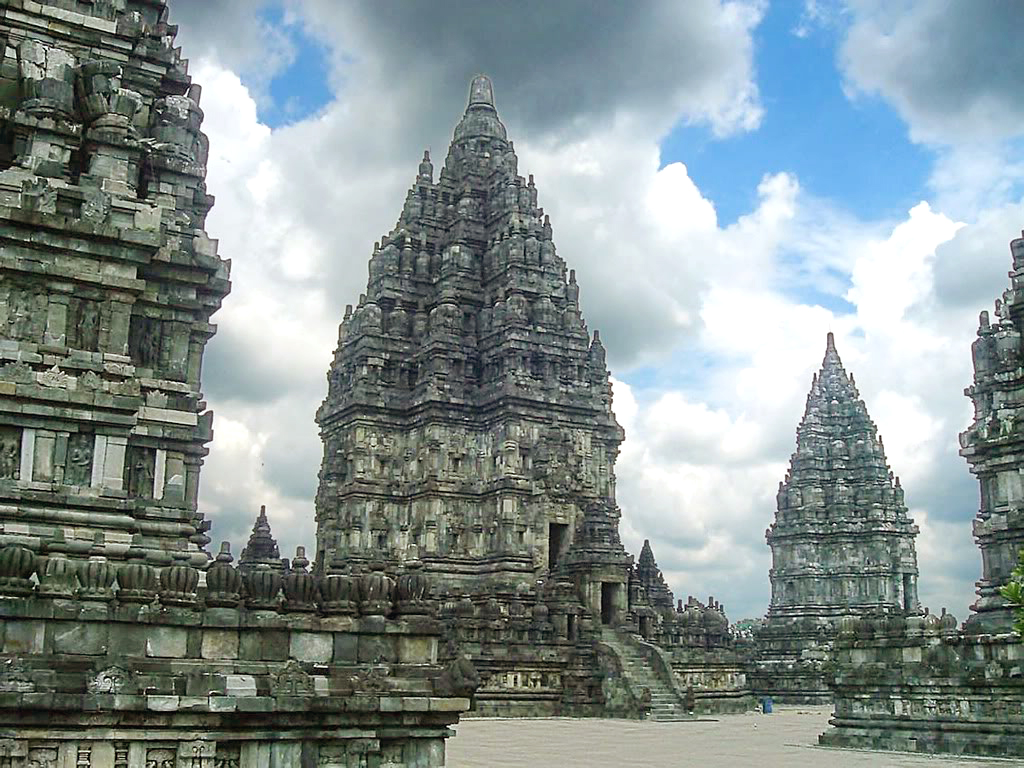
Shiva temple, the main temple at Prambanan

The Legend of Roro Jonggrang (Javanese: ꦫꦫꦗꦺꦴꦁꦒꦿꦁ, romanized: Rara Jonggrang) is a Javanese popular legend (folktales) from Central Java telling the story of love and betrayal, the warrior and the cursed princess. It also explains the mythical origin of Ratu Boko (Javanese: ꦫꦠꦸꦧꦏ, romanized: Ratu Baka) palace, Sewu temple, and the Durga statue in Prambanan temple compound. The title Roro (pronounced /rɔrɔ/ in Javanese) is an ancient honorific title to address unmarried princesses and female nobility, thus, the name Rara Jonggrang in Javanese means 'slender maiden'.

== Summary ==
The legend tells the story of two ancient and neighbouring kingdoms in Java, Pengging, and Boko.

Pengging was prosperous and wisely ruled by its king Prabu Damar Moyo (Javanese: ꦥꦿꦧꦸꦢꦩꦂꦩꦪ, romanized: Prabu Damar Maya), who had a son named Bandung Bondowoso. By contrast, Boko was ruled by a cruel man-eating giant named Prabu Boko, supported by another giant Patih Gupolo (Javanese: ꦥꦠꦶꦃꦒꦸꦥꦭ, romanized: Patih Gupala). Despite his unpleasant nature, Prabu Boko had a beautiful daughter named Roro Jonggrang.

The story relates that Prabu Boko desired to expand his kingdom and began training an army and raising taxes for an invasion of Pengging. His forces launched a surprise attack on Pengging, and the ensuing war caused devastation and famine on both sides. To defeat the invader, Prabu Damar Moyo sent his son Bandung Bondowoso to fight Prabu Boko. After a furious battle, Prabu Boko is killed by the prince's supernatural powers. His assistant, the giant Patih Gupala, led his armies away from the battlefield in defeat.

Returning to Boko Palace, Patih Gupala told Princess Roro Jonggrang of the death of her father. The princess was heartbroken, but before she could recover from her grief, the Pengging army besieged and captured the palace. Prince Bandung Bondowoso was mesmerized by the beauty of the mourning princess and proposed marriage, but his offer was swiftly rejected. Bandung Bondowoso insisted on the union, and finally, Roro Jonggrang agreed on two impossible conditions: first, the prince must build a well-named Jalatunda, and second, he must construct a thousand temples in only one night.

The love-struck prince agreed and immediately started work on the well. Using his supernatural powers once again and summoning all manner of demons, the prince swiftly finished construction and proudly displayed his work for the princess. As a trick, she urged him to enter the well, and when he did so, Patih Gupala piled stones into it and buried him alive. With great effort, Bandung Bondowoso escaped, but his love for the princess was so strong that he forgave her for the attempt on his life.

To fulfill the second condition, the prince meditated and conjured up a multitude of spirits from the earth. With their help, he built the first 999 temples and started work on the final one. To thwart his efforts, the princess and her maids lit fires in the east direction and began pounding rice padi, a traditional dawn activity. The roosters crowed. Fooled into thinking the sun was about to rise, the spirits fled back to the darkness, leaving the last temple unfinished.

The prince was furious when he learned of this deception, and He did not want to pay the blood price of sorcery alone. She tried to plead for mercy, as the prince seemed possessed by preternatural powers. But he placed a curse on Rara Jonggrang, turning her into stone. In this way, she became a feature of the final temple, completing its construction and fulfilling the conditions for their union.

== Interpretation ==
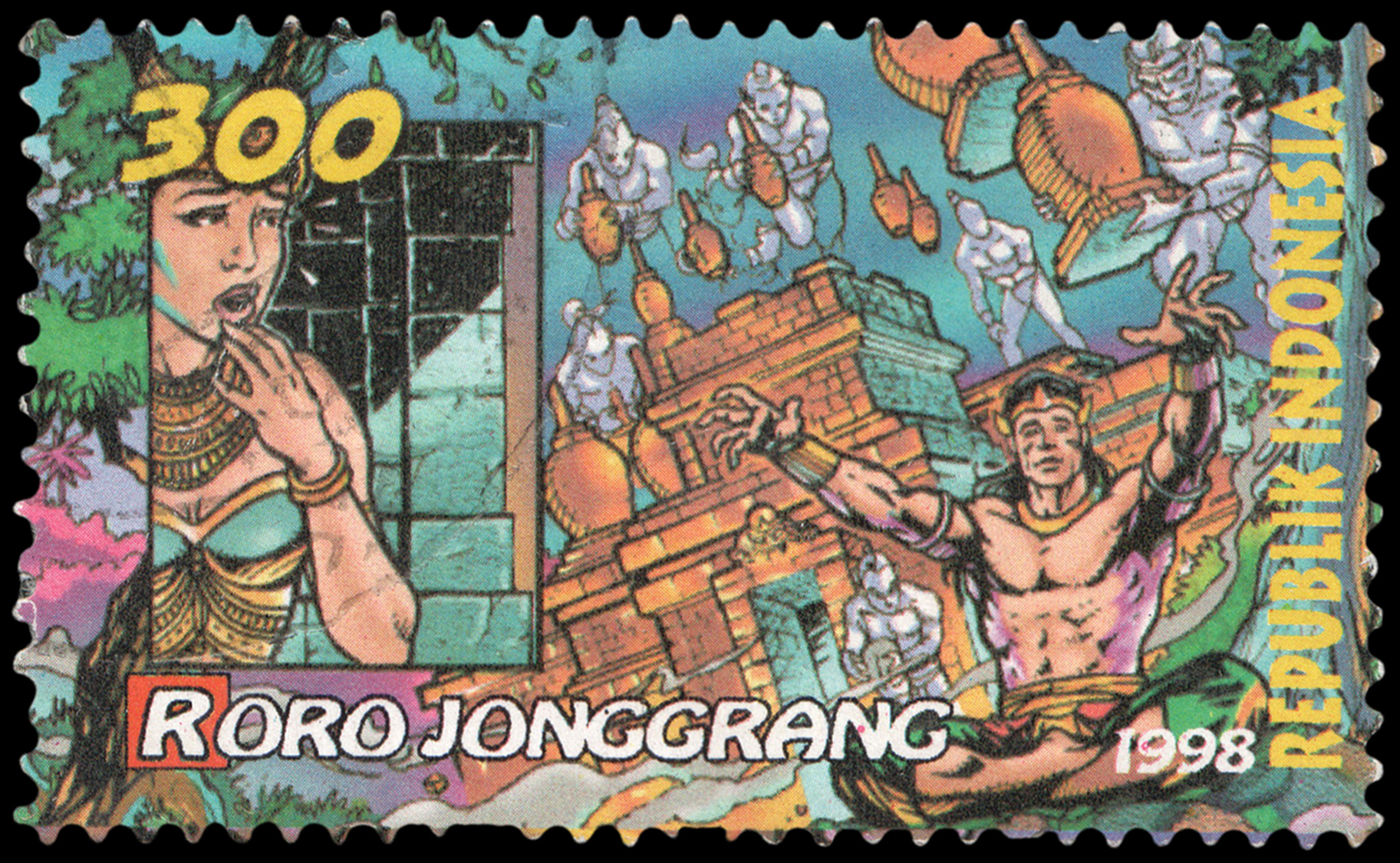
A depiction of the legend on an Indonesian stamp

This legend is a local popular folklore that connects and explains the supernatural origin of Central Java's famous archaeological sites; such as the Ratu Boko palace, the Durga statue in the northern cella/chamber of the main Prambanan shrine, and the Sewu temple complex nearby. Although the temples date from circa the 9th century, the legend was composed in later times, probably during the Mataram Sultanate era.

According to tradition, this thousandth temple is part of the Sewu temple compound (sèwu means "thousands" in Javanese), and the Princess is the image of Durga in the north cell of the Shiva temple at Prambanan, still known as Rara Jonggrang or Slender Virgin.

Another interpretation mentioned that this legend could be a collective but vague local memory about past historical events that happened in the area, staged around the 9th-century struggle for power between the Sailendra and the Sanjaya dynasty for control of Central Java. King Boko is probably inspired by King Samaratungga of the Sailendra dynasty, Bandung Bondowoso is Rakai Pikatan, a prince of the Sanjaya dynasty, and Rara Jongrang is Pramodhawardhani, wife of Rakai Pikatan and the daughter of Sailendran king. The actual historical event was probably the contest of power between Balaputradewa, the Sailendran heir, against his sister, Pramodhawardhani, aided by her husband, Rakai Pikatan, which led to Pikatan as the victor, thus ending the Sailendran rule on Central Java.
