= Kedulan =

Hindu temple in Java, Indonesia

Kedulan ꦏꦺꦣꦸꦭꦤ꧀
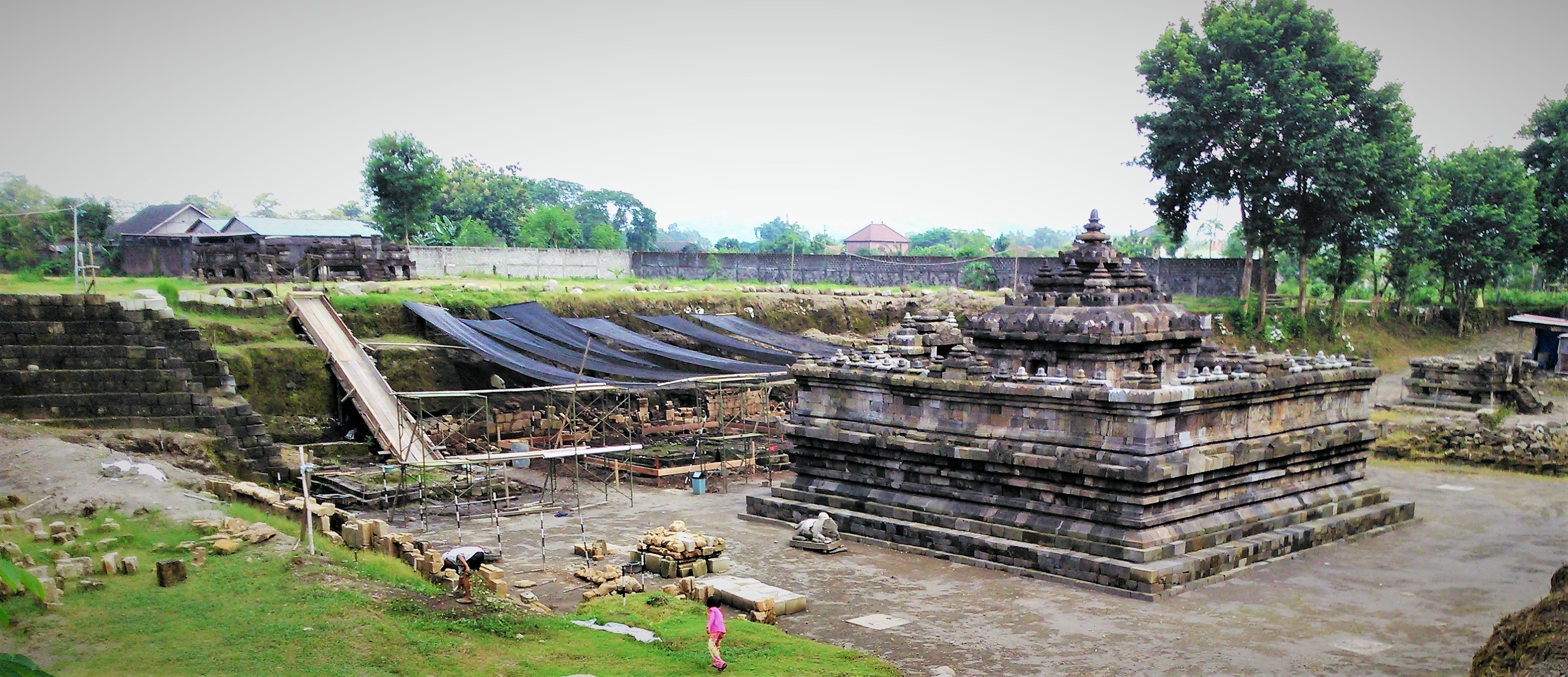
- Kedulan temple during restoration in early 2019
- Interactive map of the Kedulan ꦏꦺꦣꦸꦭꦤ꧀ area

General information
- Architectural style: Hindu candi
- Location: near Yogyakarta (city), Yogyakarta, Indonesia
- Completed: circa 9th century
- Client: Sailendra or Mataram kingdom

Kedulan temple (Indonesian: Candi Kedulan; Javanese: ꦕꦤ꧀ꦝꦶꦏꦺꦣꦸꦭꦤ꧀, romanized: Candhi Kédhulan) is the ruin of a 9th-century Hindu candi located not far from Sambisari temple. The temple is in Tirtomartani village, Kalasan subdistrict, Sleman Regency, Yogyakarta, Indonesia. The style and architecture bear striking similarities to the nearby Sambisari temple. And just like Sambisari, the temple compound is buried around 6 metres (20 ft) below the present surface, as the result of lava flow from the last eruption of Mount Merapi in the north.

The style and layout are quite similar to Sambisari temple; however, Sambisari temple faces west and is located around 2.5 kilometres (1.6 mi) to the southwest.

== Structure ==
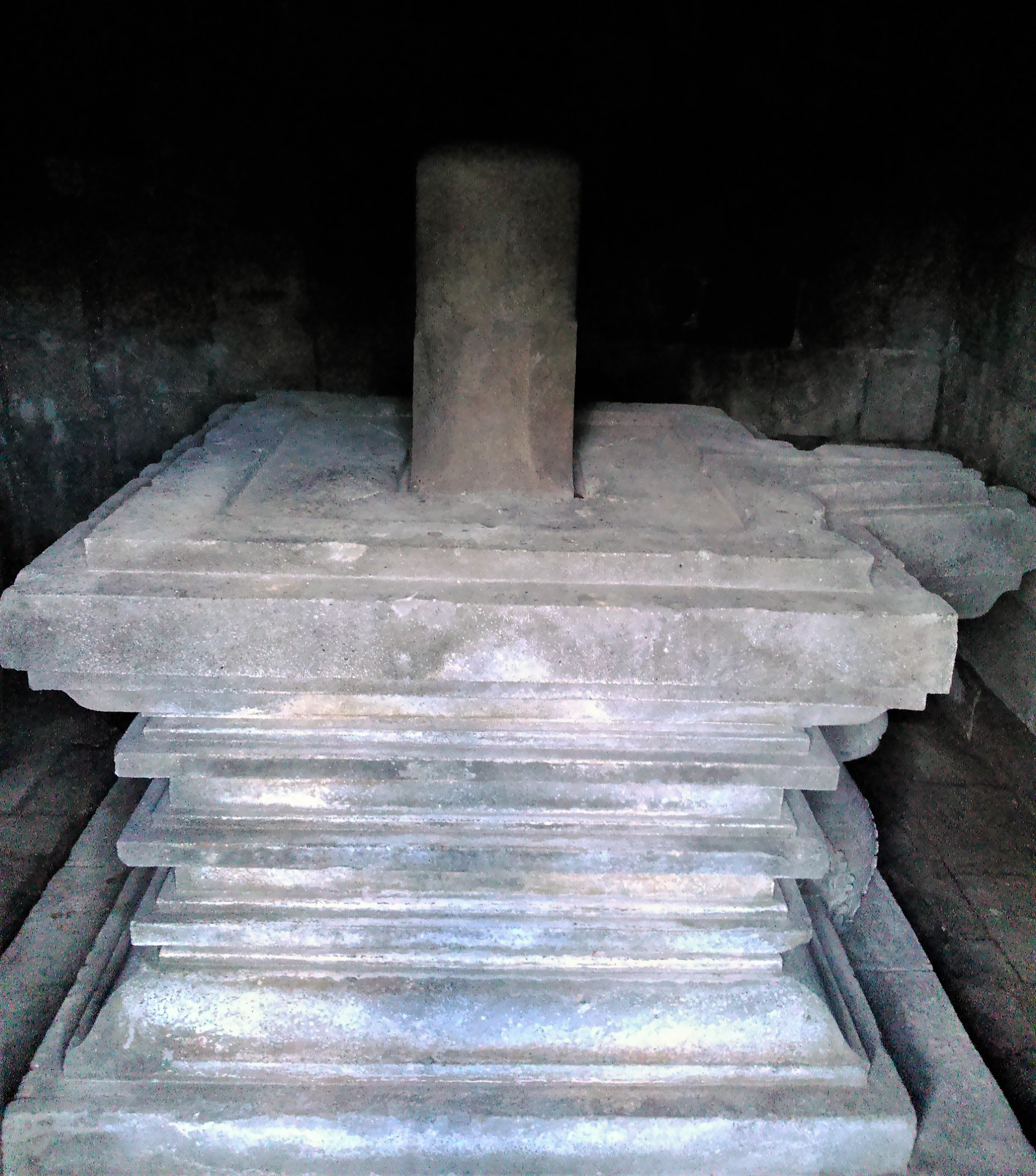
Lingga-Yoni in the main chamber

This temple was found between 3 metres (9.8 ft) to 7 metres (23 ft) below current ground level, and most likely because it was buried under the lava of Mount Merapi which erupted massively at the beginning of the 11th century.

The temple complex was a compound enclosed in stone walls, with some parts still buried underground. Within the enclosure, there are four temples; one main temple facing east, and three smaller ancillary temples (candi perwara) in front of the main temple on the eastern side in a row running north to south.

The Hindu faith of this temple can be seen through the discovery of several Hindu murtis, namely Durga Mahisasuramardini, Nandiswara, Mahakala, Ganesha and Agastya statues, and Lingga-Yoni in the main chamber. Apart from that, in perwara temples a Nandi statue, two padmasana and a lingga-yoni were found.

The main temple vertically consists of three parts, namely the foot (base), the body, and the roof of the temple. The foot of the main temple has a square plan measuring 12.05 x 12.05 meters and 2.72 meters high with a projection on the east side which functions as an entrance staircase. On each sides of the stairs there are makaras decoration flanking the stairs forming the facade of railings. The foot of the temple also has a hallway surrounded by a balustrade.

The body of the main temple is smaller than the base, measuring 4 x 4 meters and 2.6 meters high. Inside the main temple there is a garbhagriha or main chamber in which the Lingga-Yoni are placed. The entrance to the chamber is on the east side, while on either side there are niches containing Mahakala and Nandiswara statues.

In the walls of the main temple there are niches on each side which hosts murtis of Hindu deities. In the niche on the north side there is a statue of Durga. Ganesha statue is located on the niche on the west side of the temple. While the niche on the south side contains a statue of Agastya. The top of the niche is decorated with the head of Kala, on either side of the niche is decorated with pilasters with leaf and Makara motifs.

== History ==
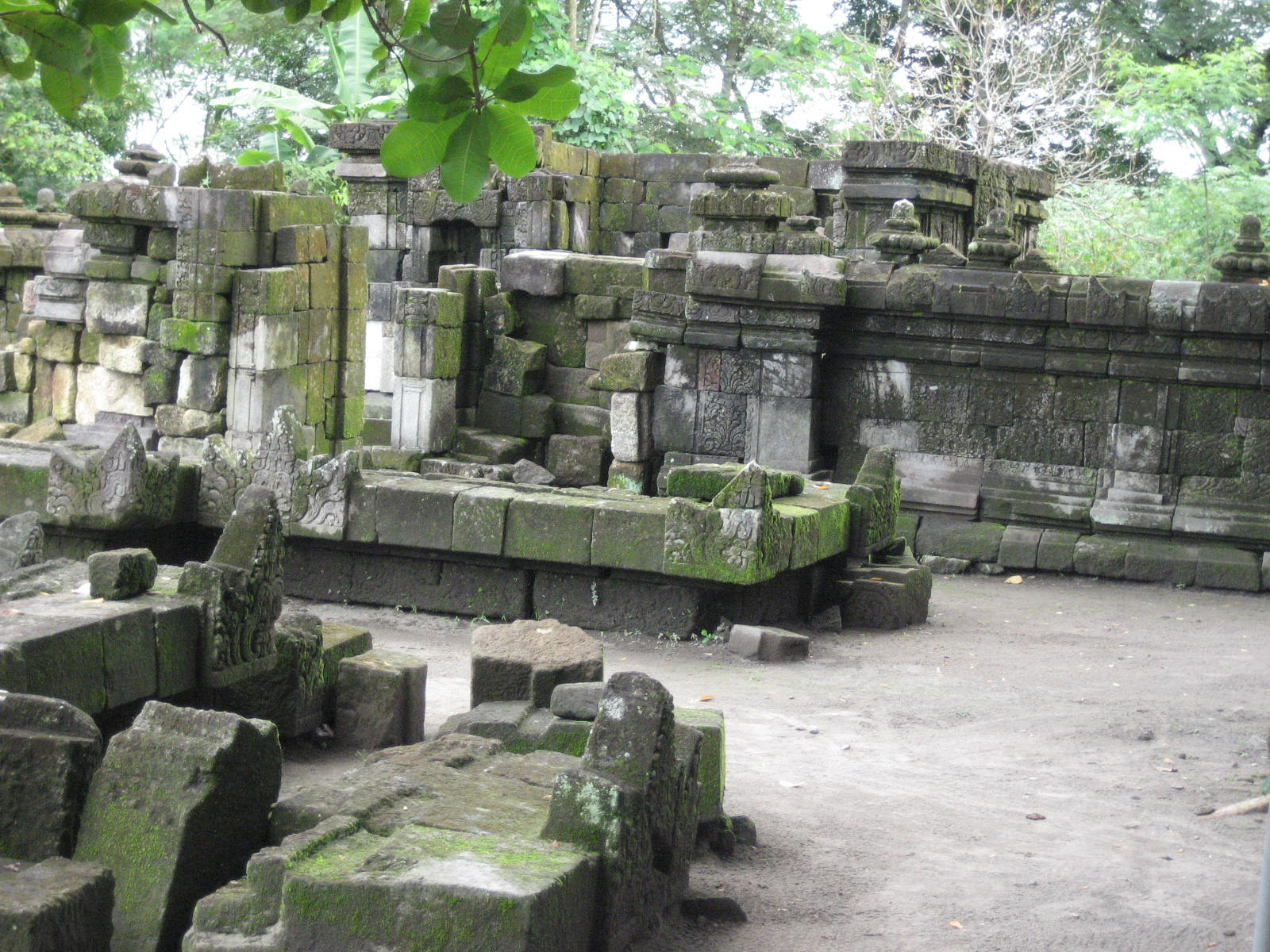
The ruins of Candi Kedulan prior of restoration

No written sources have been found explaining the history of the founding of Kedulan temple. Who built Kedulan temple in ancient times is not known. Due to the lack of sources, historians associate this temple with the Sumundul inscription and Pananggaran inscription which are dated 791 Saka or 869 CE. The two inscriptions mention the existence of a sacred building called Tiwagaharyyan. Although there is no further confirmation indicating that the sacred building mentioned in these inscriptions is Kedulan Temple, historians currently believe that Kedulan temple was built at the same time as the Sumundul and Pananggaran inscriptions, namely in the 9th century.

The main temple was accidentally discovered on 24 November 1993, when a group of volcanic sand miners quarried the land. The village communally owned the land. Subsequently, archaeological excavations were commenced, led by BP3 Yogyakarta. After digging 6–7 metres (20–23 ft) deep, the ruins of the temple's main building were uncovered. The temple floor plan is a square measuring 13.7 metres (45 ft) on each side, and the height of the main building is 8.009 metres (26.28 ft) tall.

In 2017, the archaeological study and reconstruction project were in progress, and by early 2018, the temple reconstruction entered the anastylosis phase. The restoration of the entire Kedulan Temple complex was expected to be completed by the end of 2018. However, due to COVID-19 pandemic the temple reconstruction was postponed. The reconstruction project is restarted in 2021.

== Gallery ==
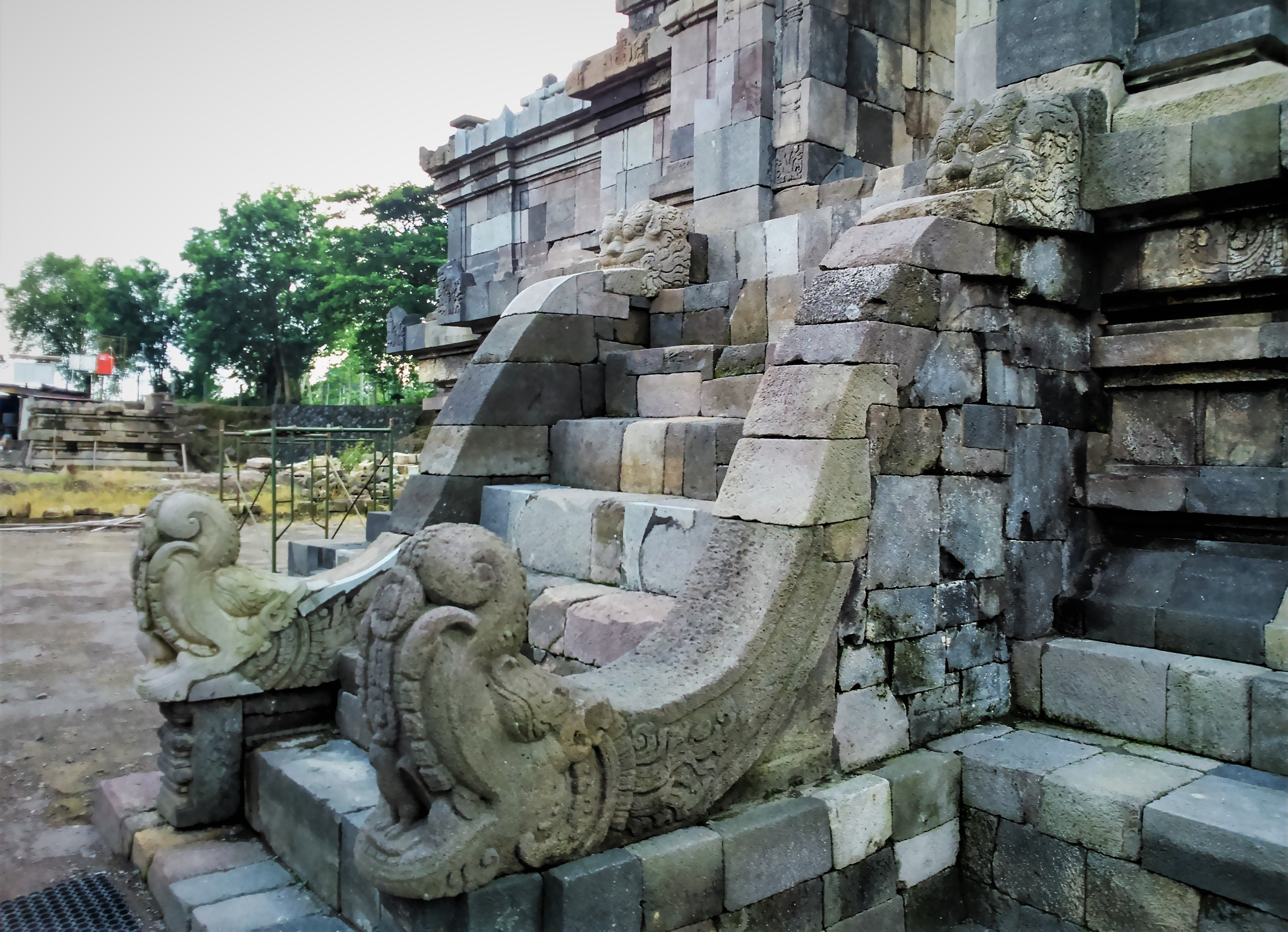
The stairs of main temple flanked by makaras

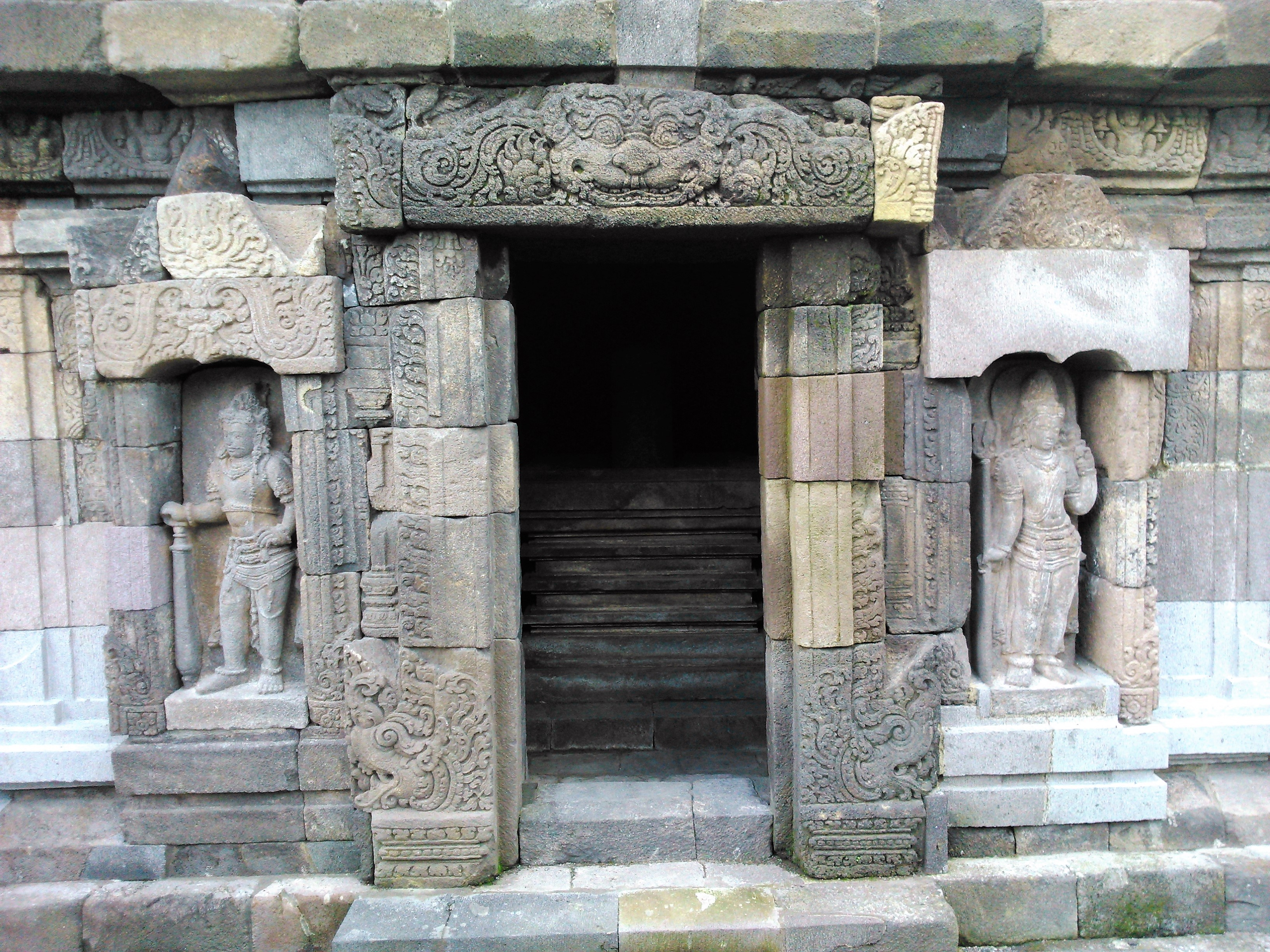
East side of main temple with portal flanked with niches containing murtis of Mahakala and Nandisvara

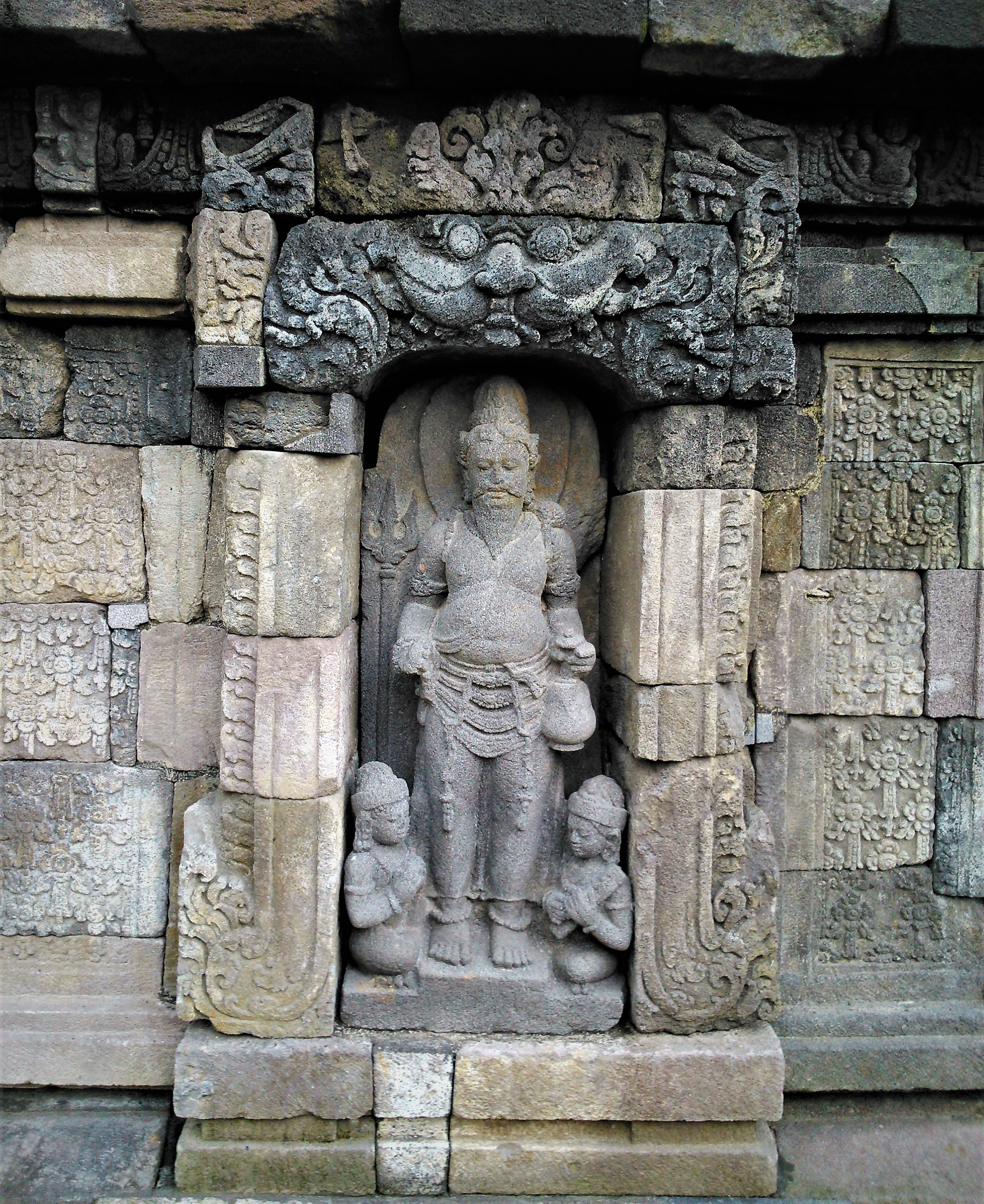
A murti of Agastya in southern niche

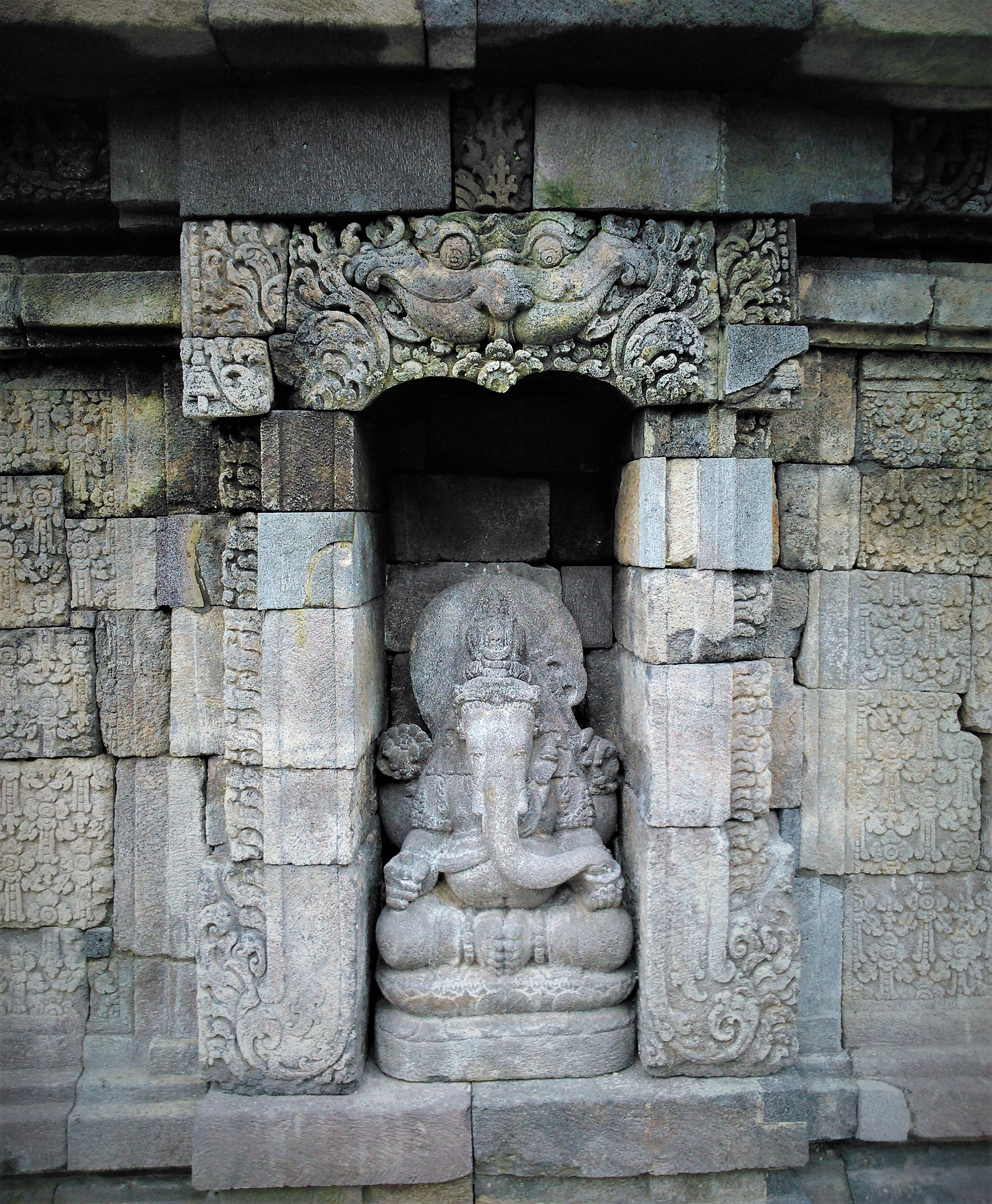
A murti of Ganesha in western niche

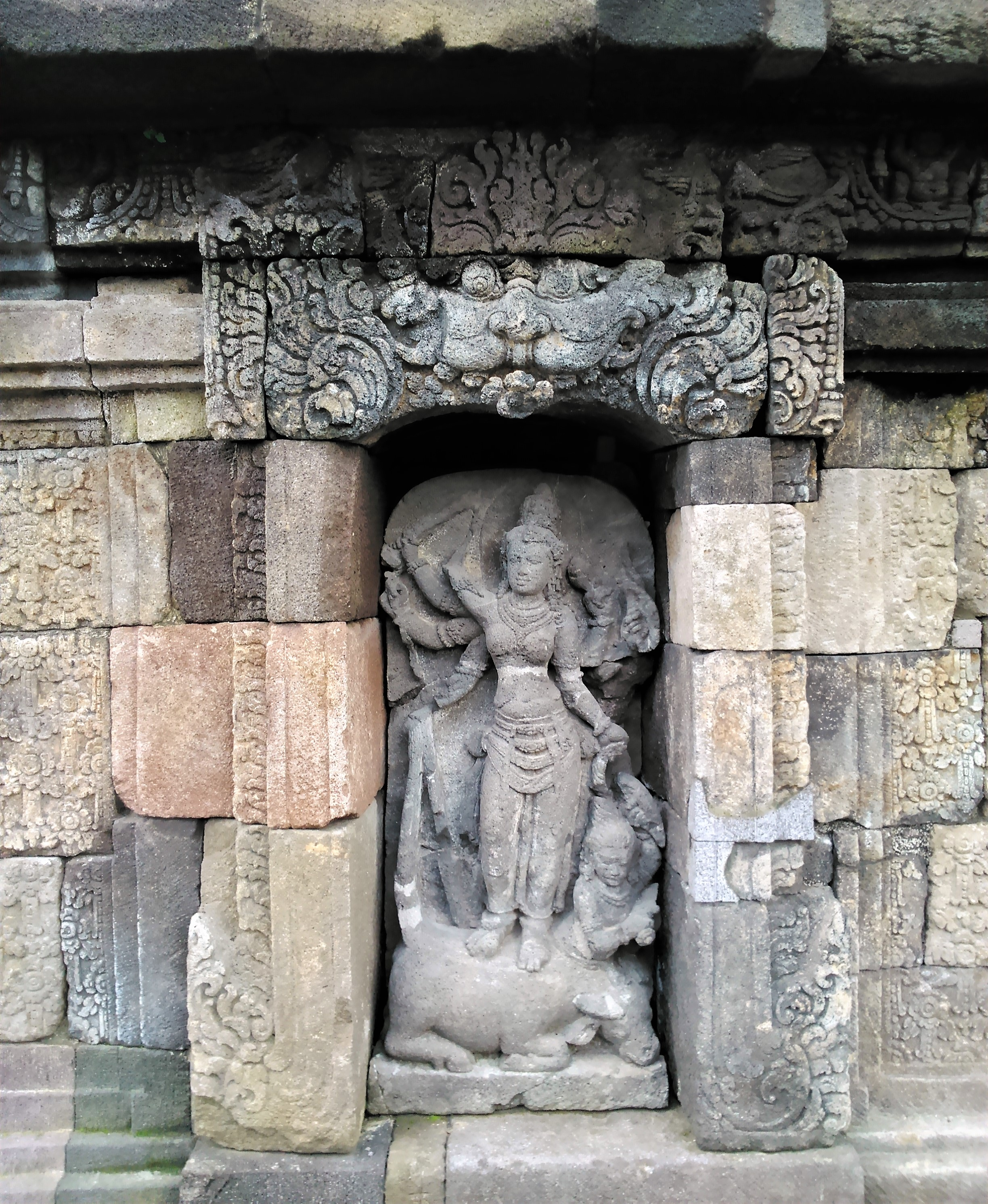
A murti of Durga Mahisasuramardini in northern niche

== See also ==
- Kewu Plain
- Kalasan
- Prambanan
- Ratu Boko
- Banyunibo
- Ijo
- Barong
