= Barong =

Barong may refer to any of the following things:

- Barong tagalog, an embroidered formal garment of the Philippines
- Barong (mythology), name of the king of the spirits, leader of the hosts of good, and enemy of Rangda in the mythological traditions of Bali
- Barong Temple, a 9th-century Hindu temple located near Prambanan, Yogyakarta
- Barong (sword), a short, yet wide, leaf shaped blade or knife used by the Moro peoples of the Philippines and Sabah

== See also ==
- Barongan, a traditional Indonesian Reog dance, also performed by Indonesians in Malaysia
- Barongsai, a traditional lion dance of Chinese descendants in Indonesia
