= Kewu Plain =

Plain in Java, Indonesia

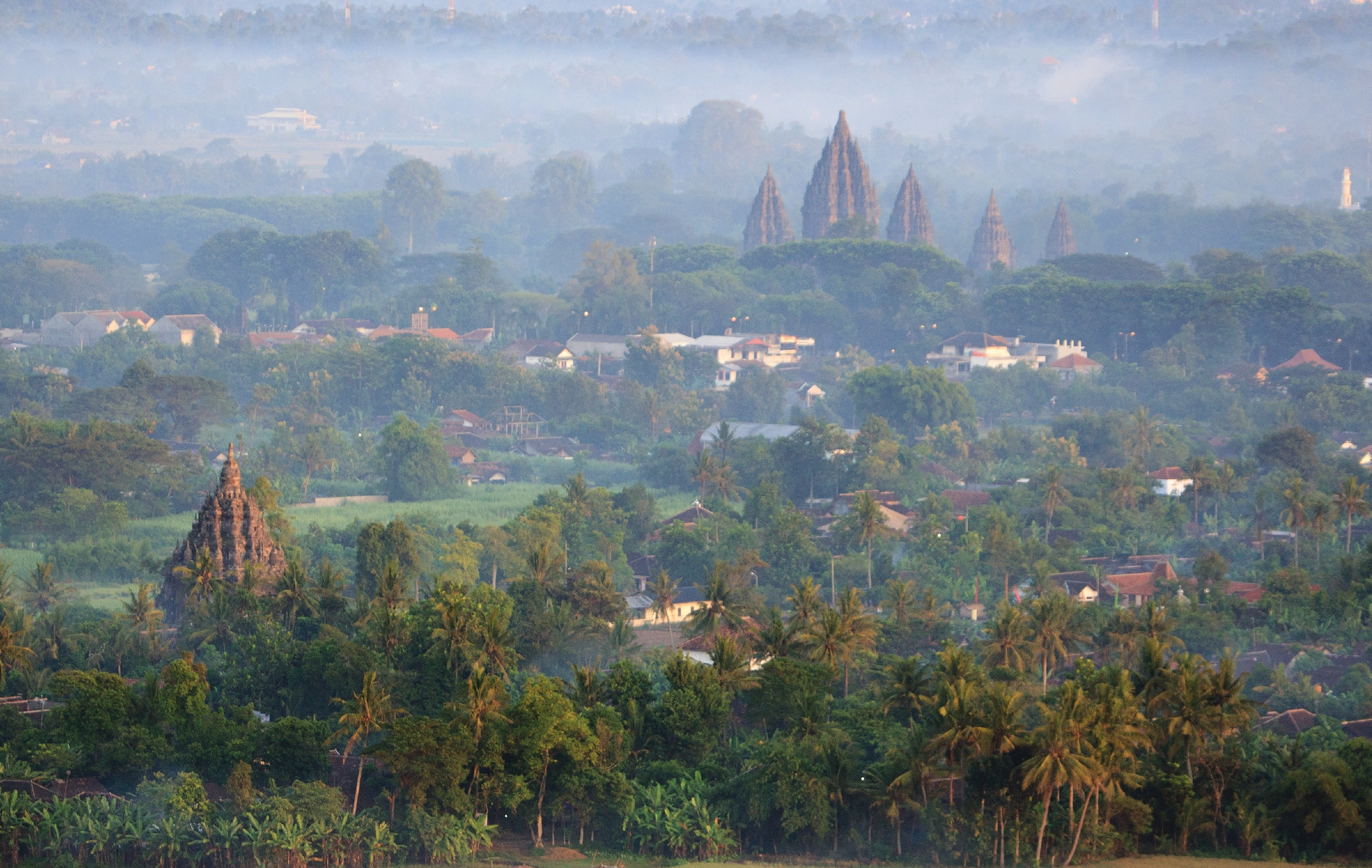
Sojiwan temple is on the bottom left and Prambanan temple is on the top right, in the center of Prambanan Plain viewed from Ratu Boko Hill.

Kewu Plain, also known as Prambanan Plain or Opak River Valley, is a fertile volcanic plain that lies between the Merapi-Merbabu complex in the north, the Bantul lowlands and Sewu karst limestone range in the south, Bengawan Solo river valley in the east, the Progo River in the west, and Kedu Plain on the northwest. It is located within the Yogyakarta Special Region, Sleman Regency, Klaten Regency, and Solo City (Central Java), Indonesia.

Historically the area was identified as Mamratipura. The region was the center of both the Mataram kingdom in the 8th to 10th centuries, and later the Mataram Sultanate in the 16th century. It has been an important location in Central Javanese history and culture for over a millennium since it contains many ancient archaeological remnants of historic significance. If each temple structure was counted separately, the 9th century Central Java period could be said to have produced thousands of temples, scattered from Dieng Plateau, Kedu Plain to Kewu Plain.

== Cultural and historical significance ==
Apart from the Prambanan Roro Jonggrang complex, Kewu Plain along with the valley and hills around it is the location of some of the earliest Hindu-Buddhist temples in Indonesia. Adjacent to the complex to the north are Bubrah temple, Lumbung temple, and Sewu temple; to the east are found Plaosan temple. Kalasan temple and Sari temple are to the west and further is the Sambisari temple. The Ratu Boko compounds are on higher ground just to the south. The discoveries of archaeological sites scattered only a few miles away suggested that this area was once an important religious, political, and urban center of central Java. Despite the smaller scale of its temples, the diversity and sophistication of the archaeological sites in this plain are comparable to Angkor archaeological sites in Cambodia. Borobudur and Prambanan in particular, are popularly regarded as the two Indonesian temples to rival Angkor Wat in Cambodia.

In 2012, the Balai Pelestarian Peninggalan Purbakala Jawa Tengah (BP3, or the Central Java Heritage Preservation Authority) suggested that the area in and around Prambanan should be treated as a sanctuary. The proposed area is in the Prambanan Plain measuring measured 30 square kilometres (12 sq mi) spread across the Sleman and Klaten regencies. The area includes major temples such as Prambanan, Ratu Boko, Kalasan, Sari, and Plaosan temples. The sanctuary is planned to be treated similarly to the Angkor archaeological area in Cambodia, which suggests that the government should prevent or regulate permits to construct any new buildings, especially the multi-storied buildings, as well as BTS towers. This was meant to protect this archaeologically rich area from modern-day visual obstructions and the encroachments of hotels, restaurants, and any tourism-related buildings and businesses.

== Agriculture ==
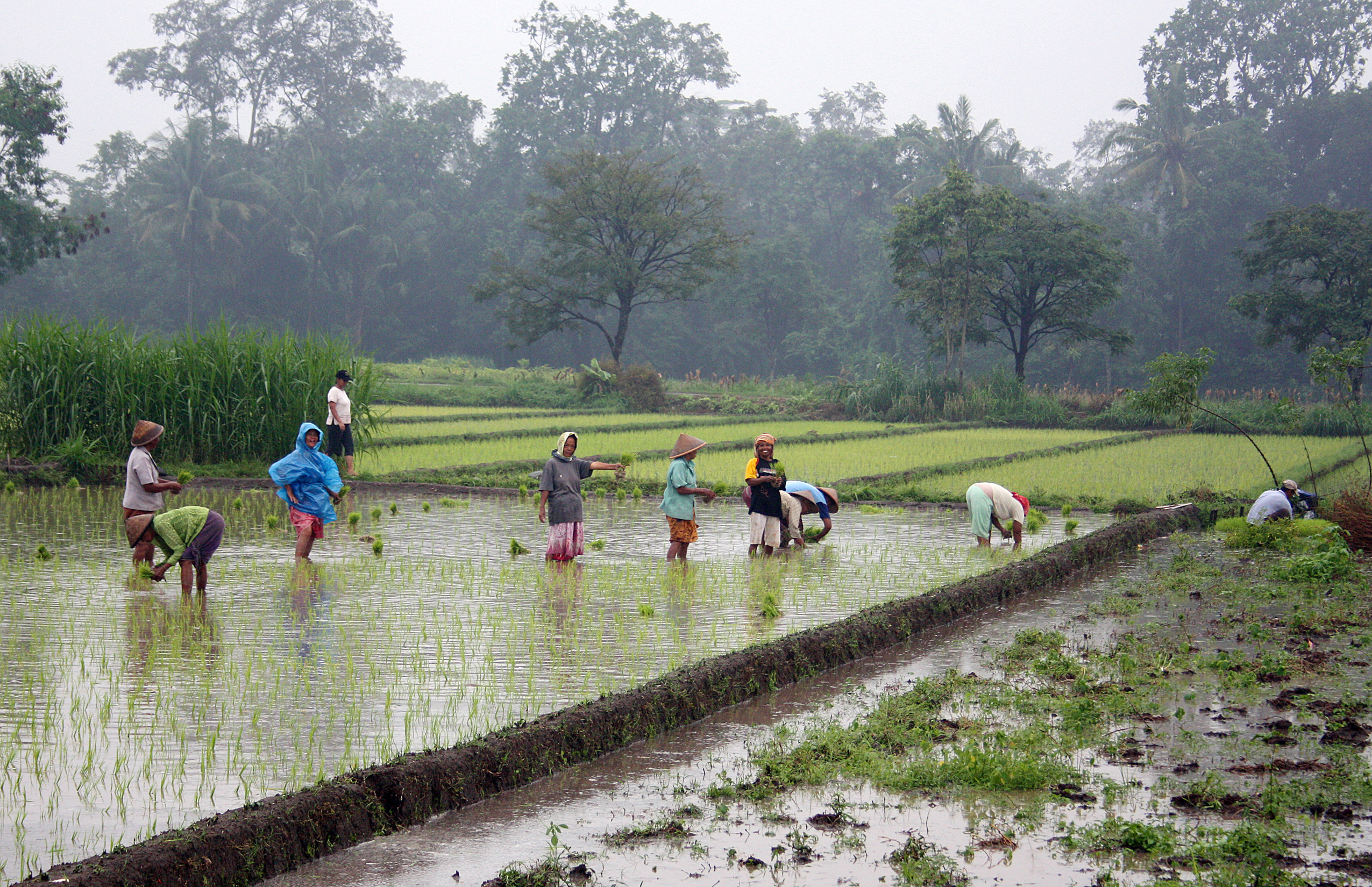
Javanese women planting rice in a ricefield near Prambanan, Yogyakarta

For centuries Prambanan Plain, overshadowed by the Merapi volcano, was known for its rich and fertile volcanic soil perfect for intensive rice cultivation. The economy of Java relied heavily on rice agriculture, and the ancient polity of Central Java, with its complex political, economic, and social systems, flourished on this plain.

The images of rice agriculture scenes and activities can be found in bas-reliefs in Borobudur and Prambanan. The early Mataram Kingdom was dependent on rice yields and taxes collected from their subjects. Java was famous for rice surpluses and rice exports, and rice agriculture contributed to the population growth of the island. Many of the rice paddies in the landscape remain unchanged from the earlier eras.

== Archaeological sites ==

- Kalasan. According to the Kalasan inscription, it is the oldest temple built on the plain. This early 8th-century Buddhist temple was built to honor the female bodhisattva, Tara.
- Sari. Once a sanctuary or monastery for Buddhist priests. 8th century. Nine stupas at the top with two rooms beneath, each believed to be places for priests to meditate.
- Ratu Boko. The complex of fortified gates, bathing pools, and elevated walled stone enclosure, are all located on top of the hill south of Prambanan.
- Lumbung. Buddhist-style, consisting of one main temple surrounded by 16 smaller ones.
- Bubrah. Buddhist temple related to the nearby Sewu temple.
- Sewu. This Buddhist temple complex is older than Prambanan temple. The original name of this temple is Manjusrigrha and it was a royal Buddhist temple of the kingdom. A main sanctuary surrounded by many smaller temples. Well-preserved guardian statues, replicas of which stand in the central courtyard at the Jogja Kraton.
- Prambanan. A large compound of 9th century Shivaic Trimurti Hindu temple. The construction of a grand Hindu temple was probably the sign that Hinduism once again gained the royal patronage of Mataram kings.
- Plaosan. Buddhist, probably 9th century. Thought to have been built by a Hindu king for his Buddhist queen. Two main temples with reliefs of Bodhisattva and Tara. Also rows of slender stupas.
- Sojiwan. Buddhist temple decorated with reliefs concerning education. The base and staircase are decorated with animal fables. Sojiwan was probably the mortuary temple for a buddhist queen, Sang Sanjiwana or Pramodhawardhani.
- Banyunibo. A Buddhist temple with unique design of roof.
- Barong. A Hindu temple complex with large stepped stone courtyard. Located on the slope of the hill not far from Banyunibo and Ratu Boko.
- Ijo. A cluster of Hindu temple located near the top of Ijo hill. The main temple houses a large lingam and yoni.
- Arca Bugisan. Seven Buddha and bodhisattva statues, some collapsed, representing different poses and expressions.
- Gebang. A small Hindu temple discovered in 1937 located near the Yogyakarta northern ring-road. The temple display the statue of Ganesha and interesting carving of faces on the roof section.
- Gana. Rich in statues, bas-reliefs and sculpted stones. Frequent representations of children or dwarfs with raised hands. Located in the middle of housing complex. Under restoration since 1997.
- Sambisari. Discovered in 1966, this Hindu temple was buried in volcanic lahar 4m deep. A main temple housen a large linggam and yoni with three smaller temple at the front.
- Kedulan. Discovered in 1994 by sand diggers, 4m deep. Square base of main temple visible. Secondary temples not yet fully excavated. This temple shared similar design and style with Sambisari.
- Morangan. Hindu temple complex buried several meters under volcanic ashes, located northwest from Prambanan.
- Pustakasala. Discovered in 2009 buried in Indonesia Islamic University ground. Together with Morangan these temple is the northernmost of temples discovered in this area.

== Gallery of temples in Kewu plain ==
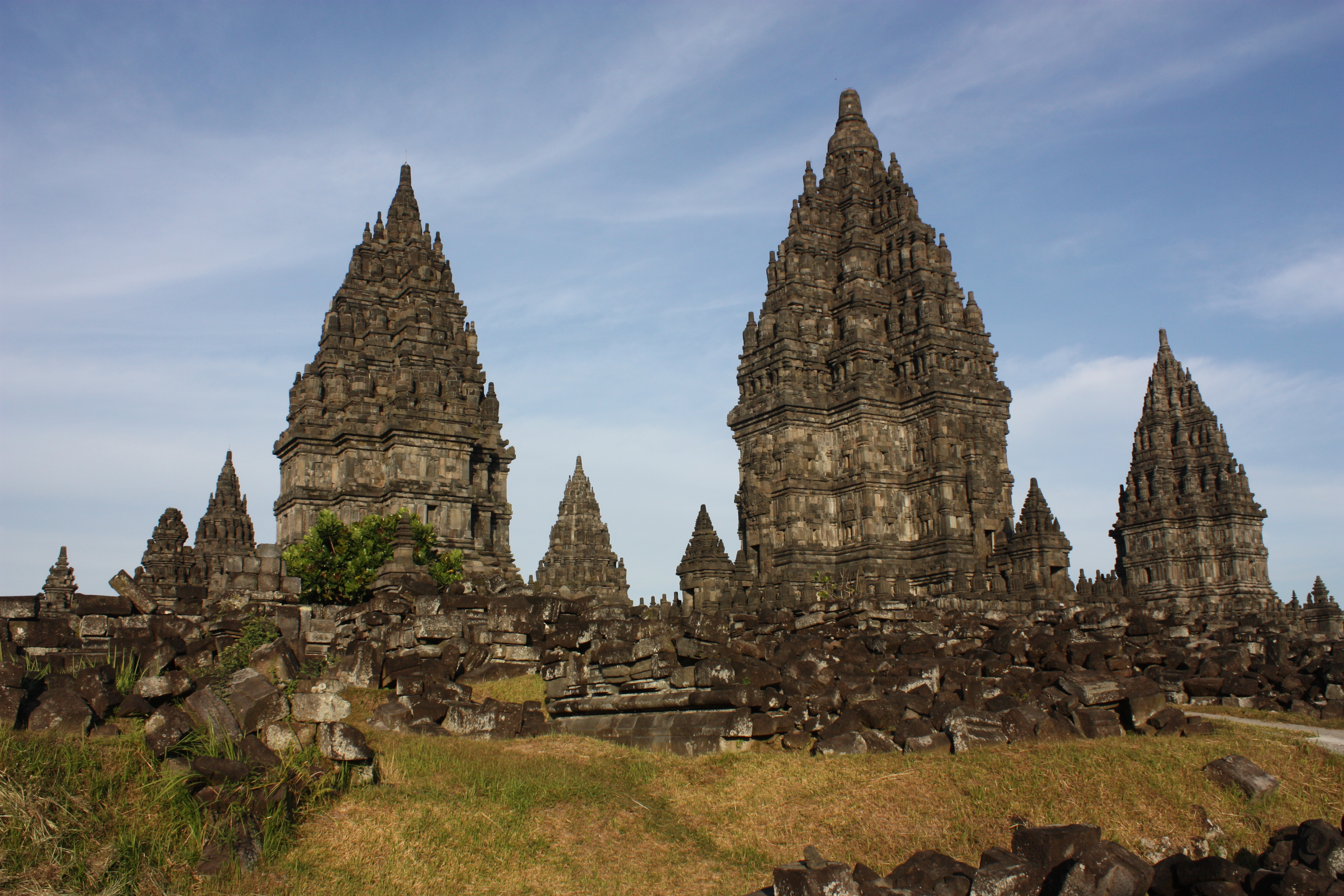
Prambanan

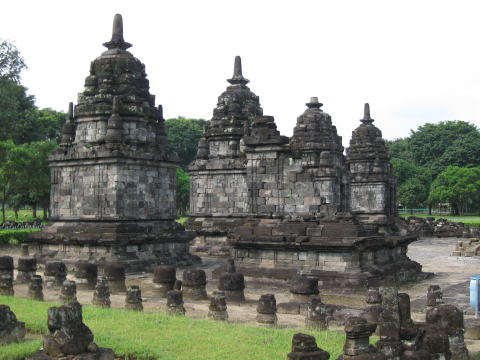
Lumbung

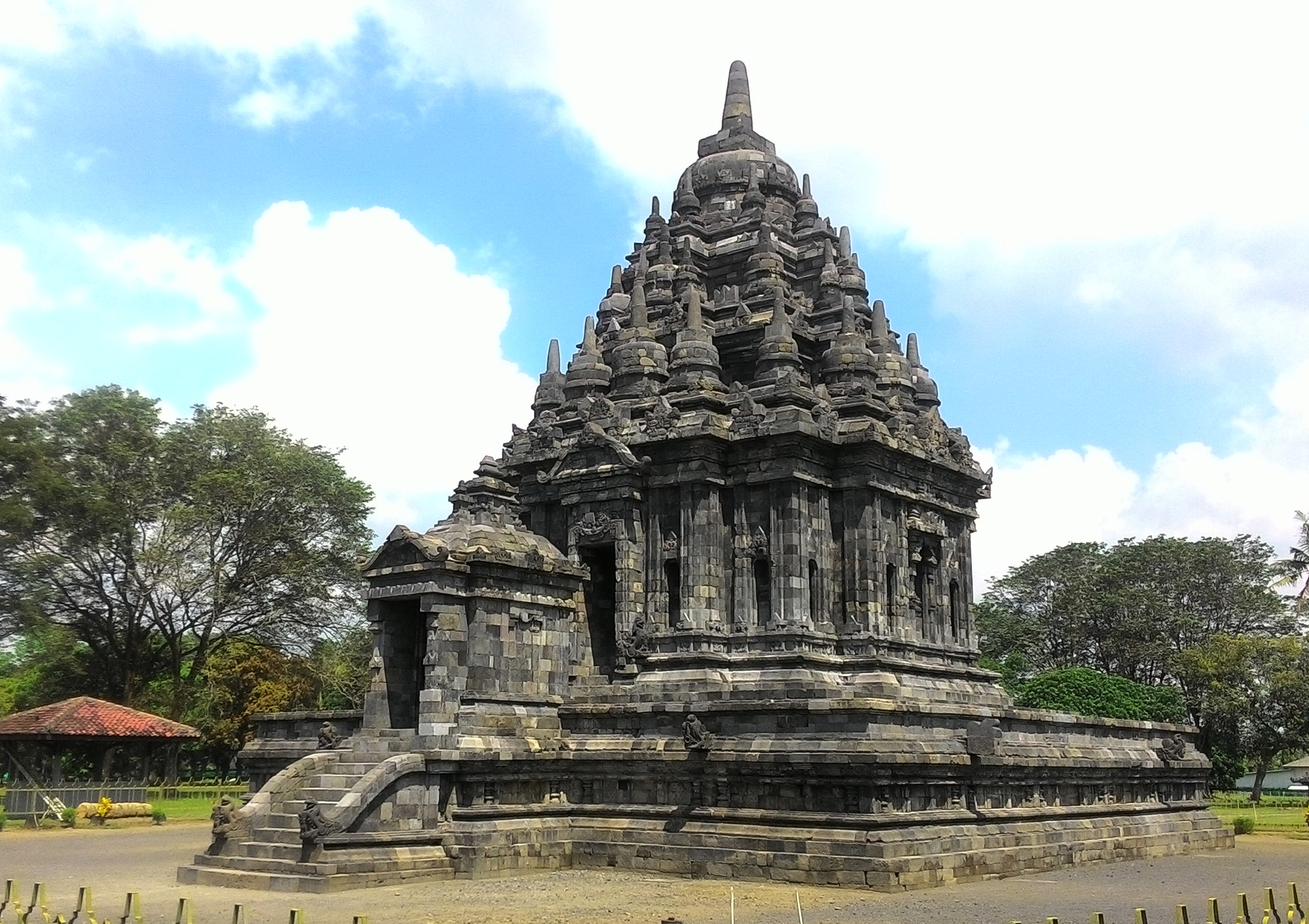
Bubrah

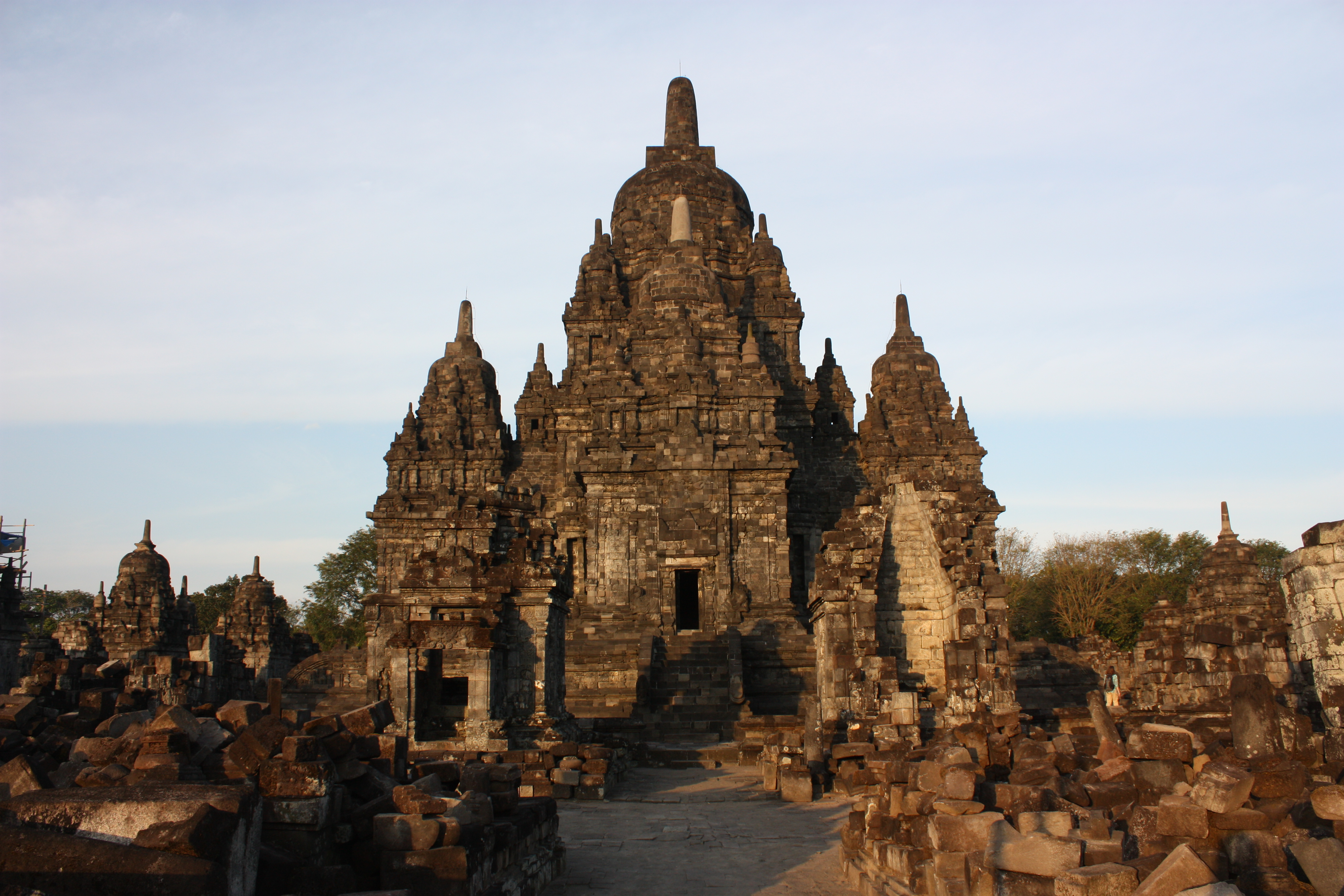
Sewu

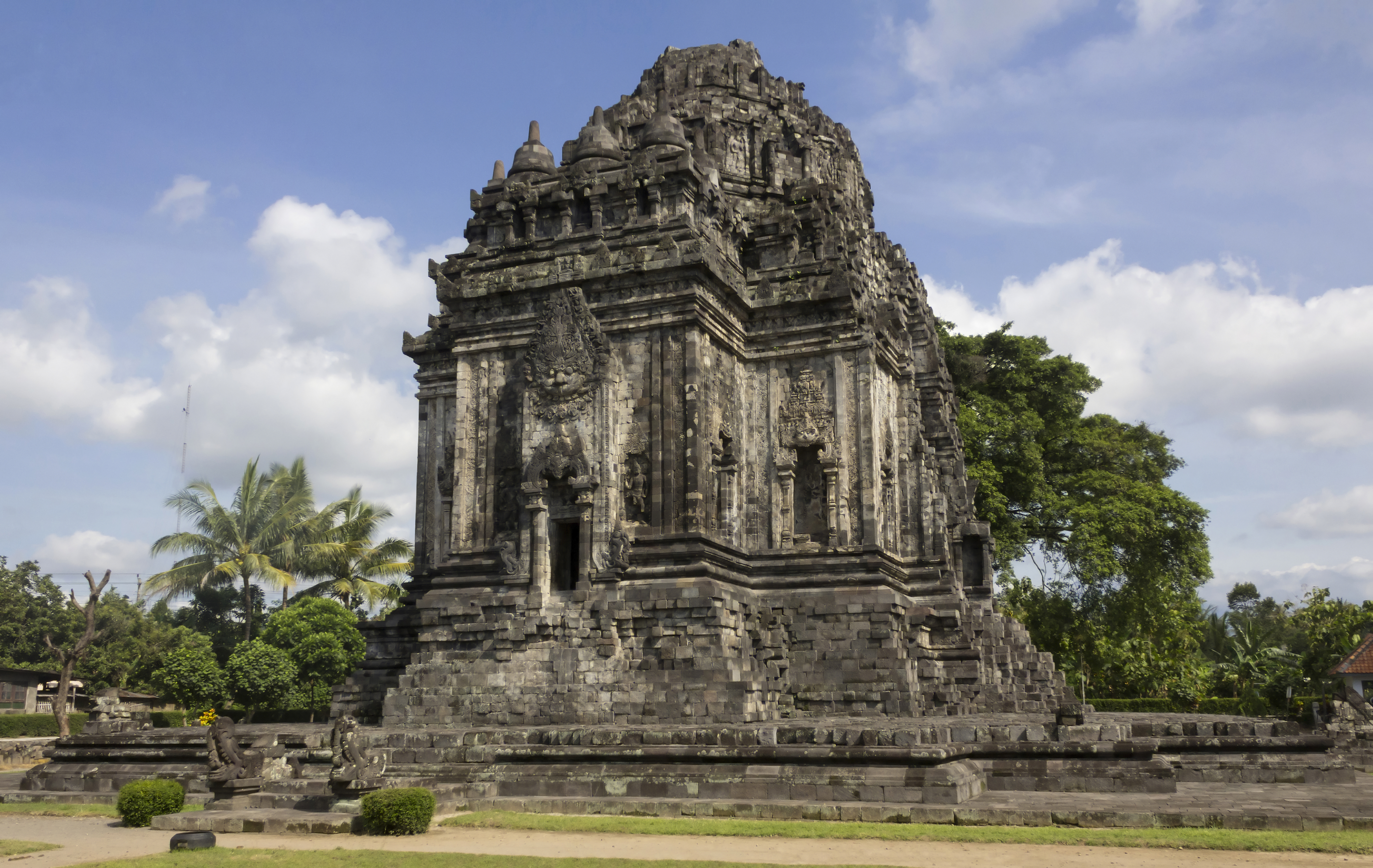
Kalasan

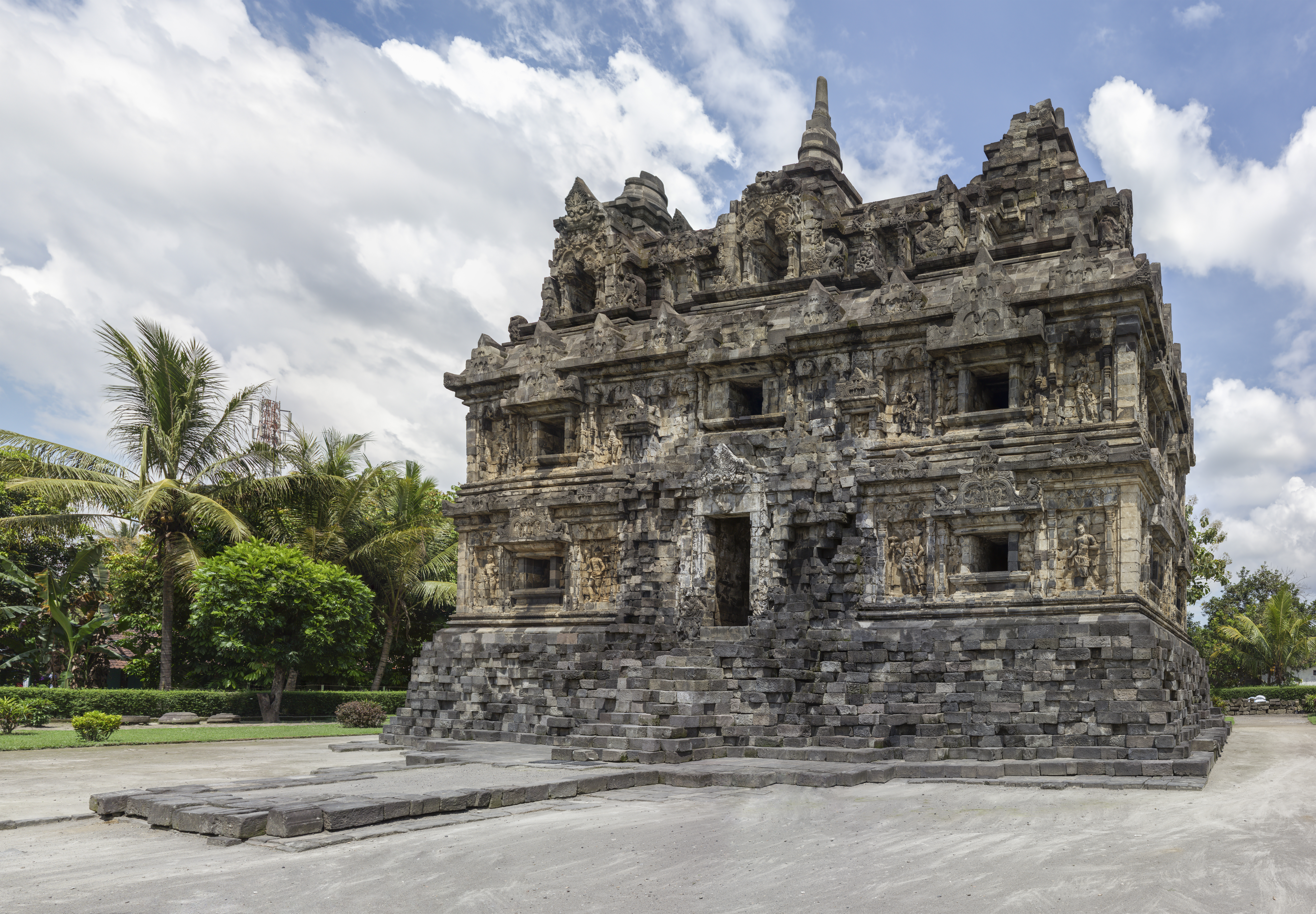
Sari

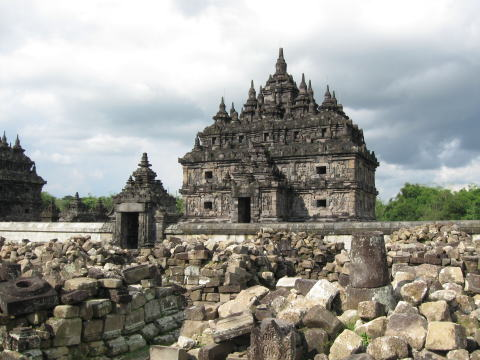
Plaosan Lor

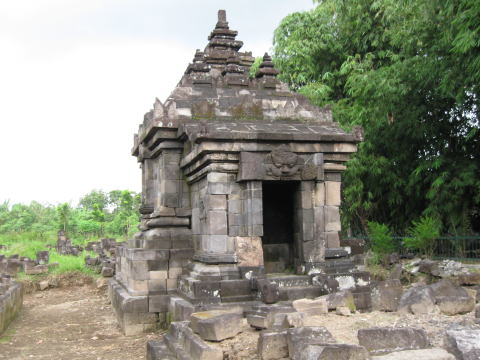
Plaosan Kidul

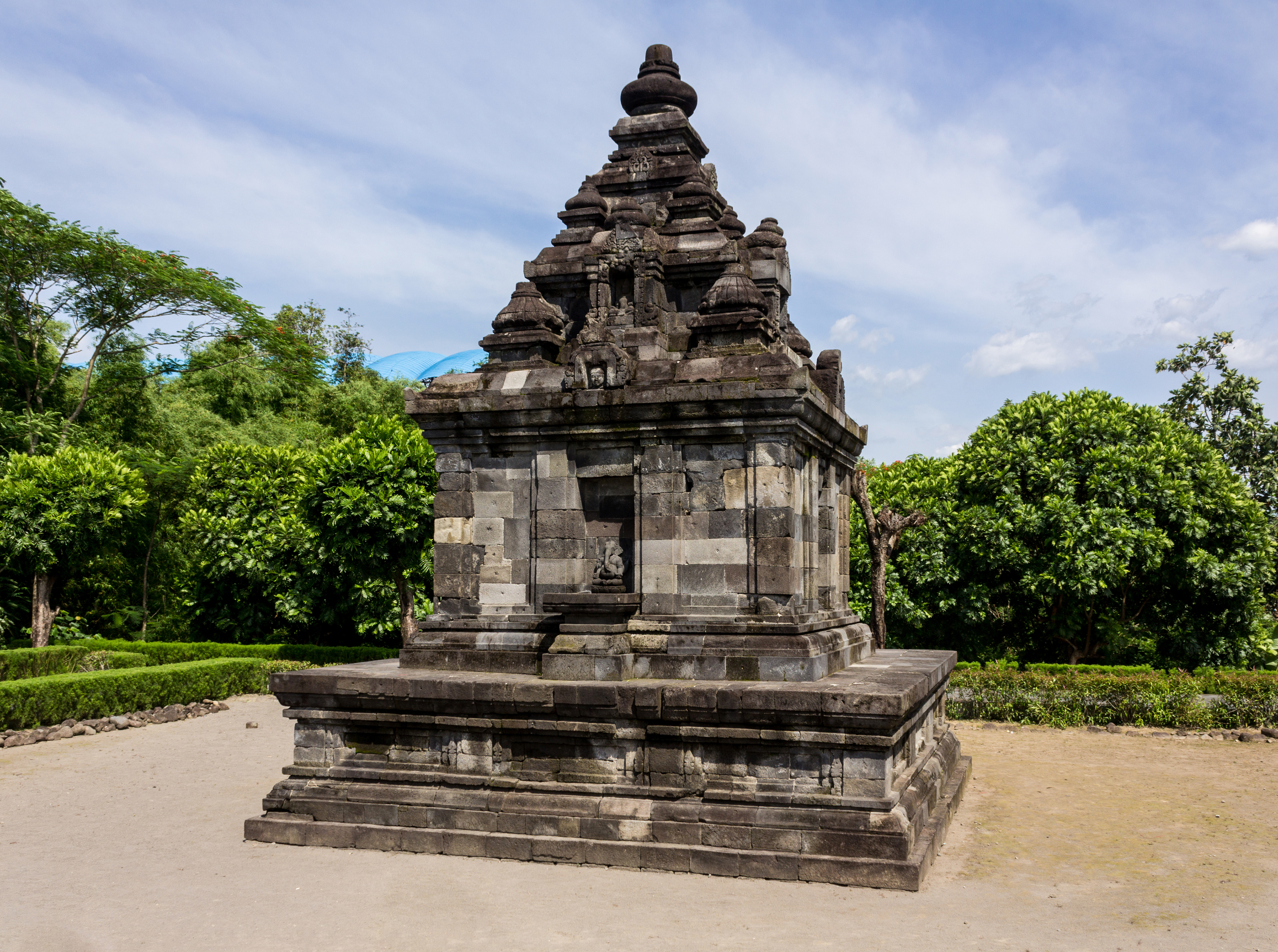
Gebang

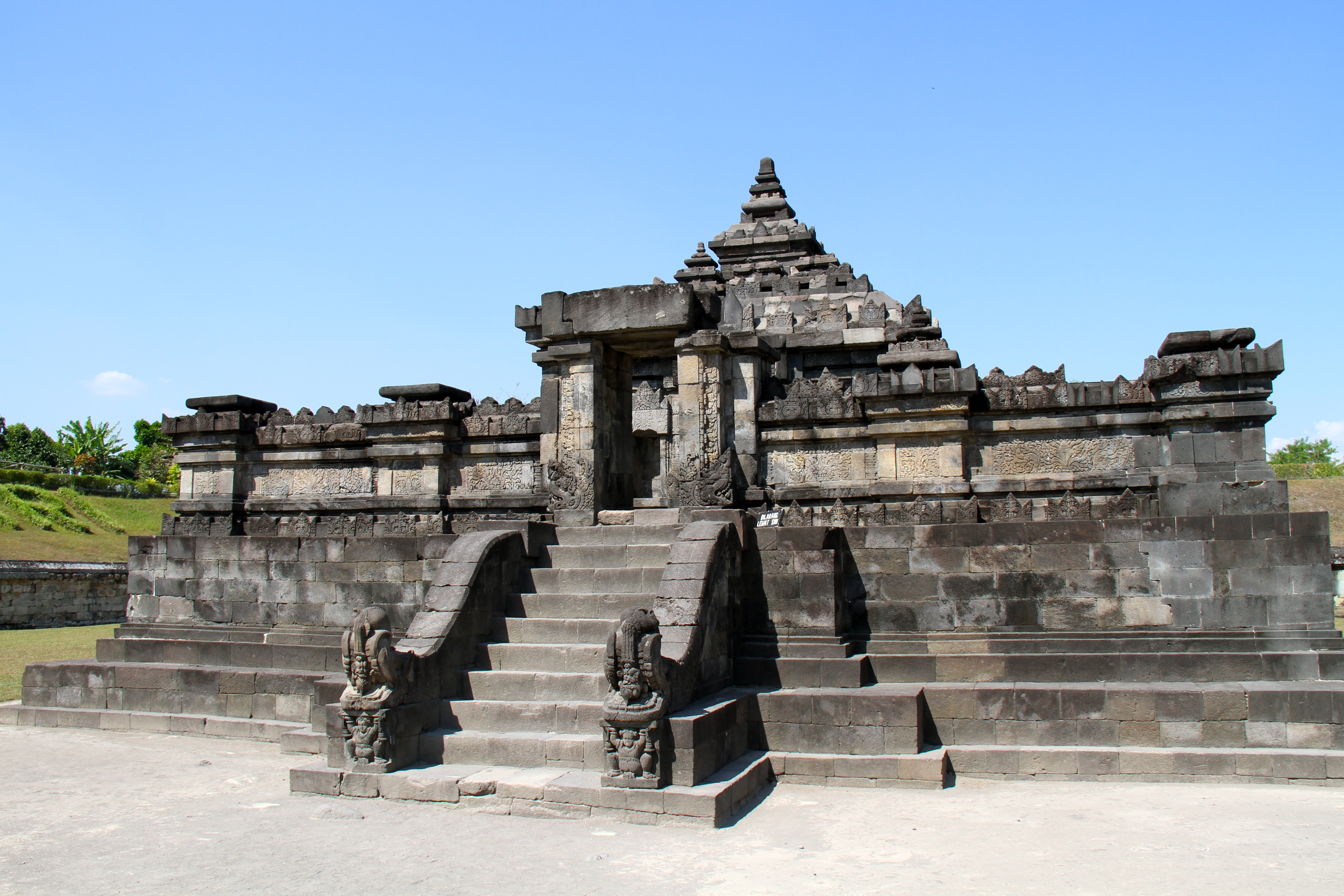
Sambisari

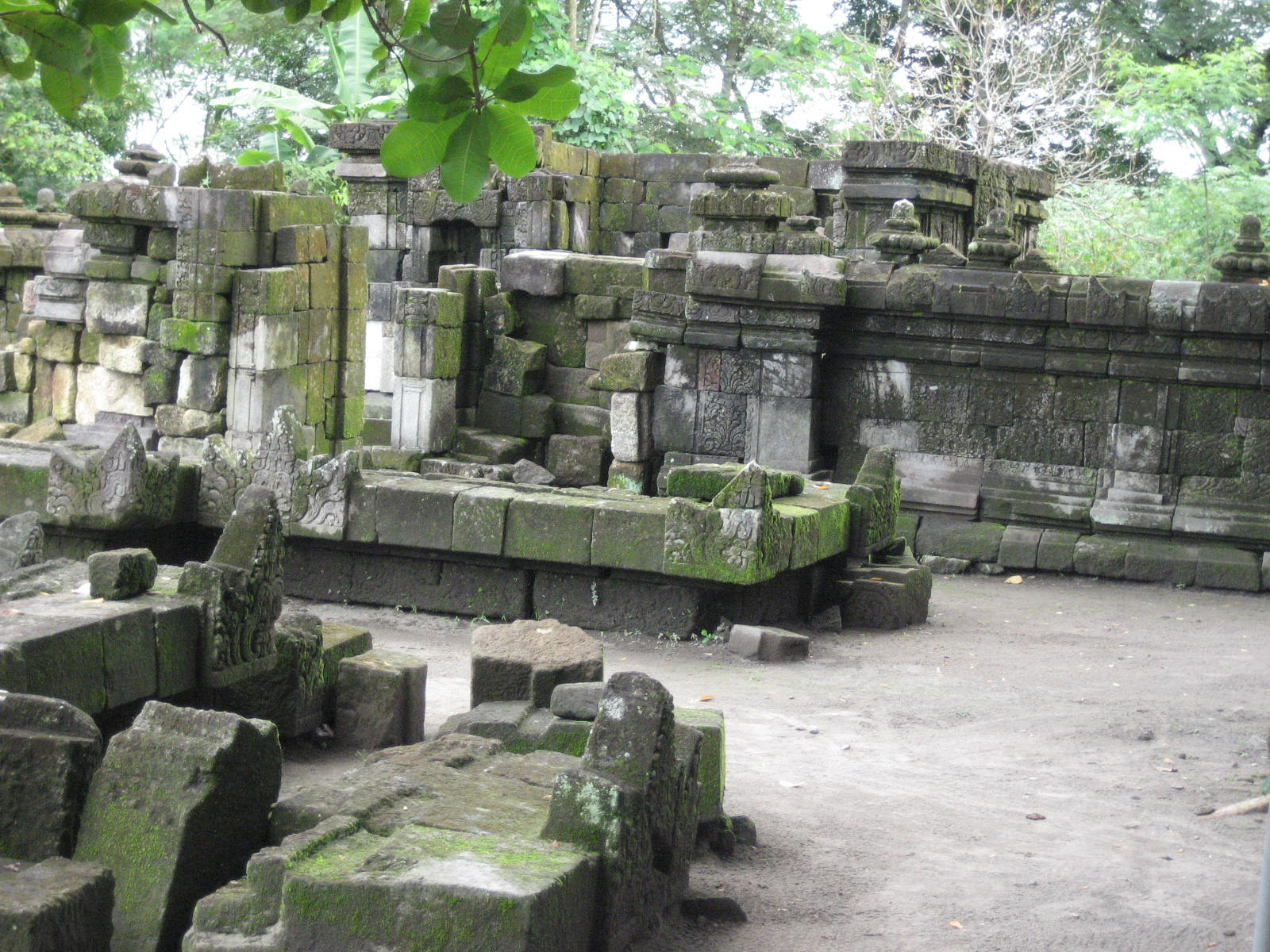
Kedulan

Kimpulan (Pustakasala)

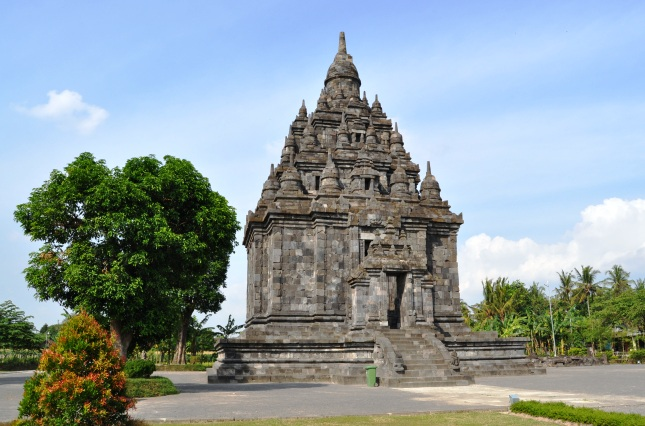
Sojiwan

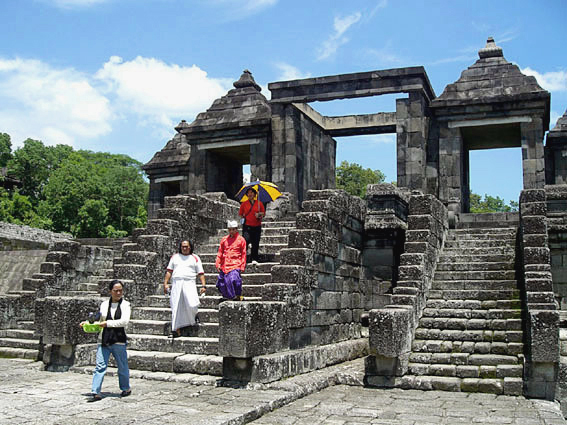
Ratu Boko

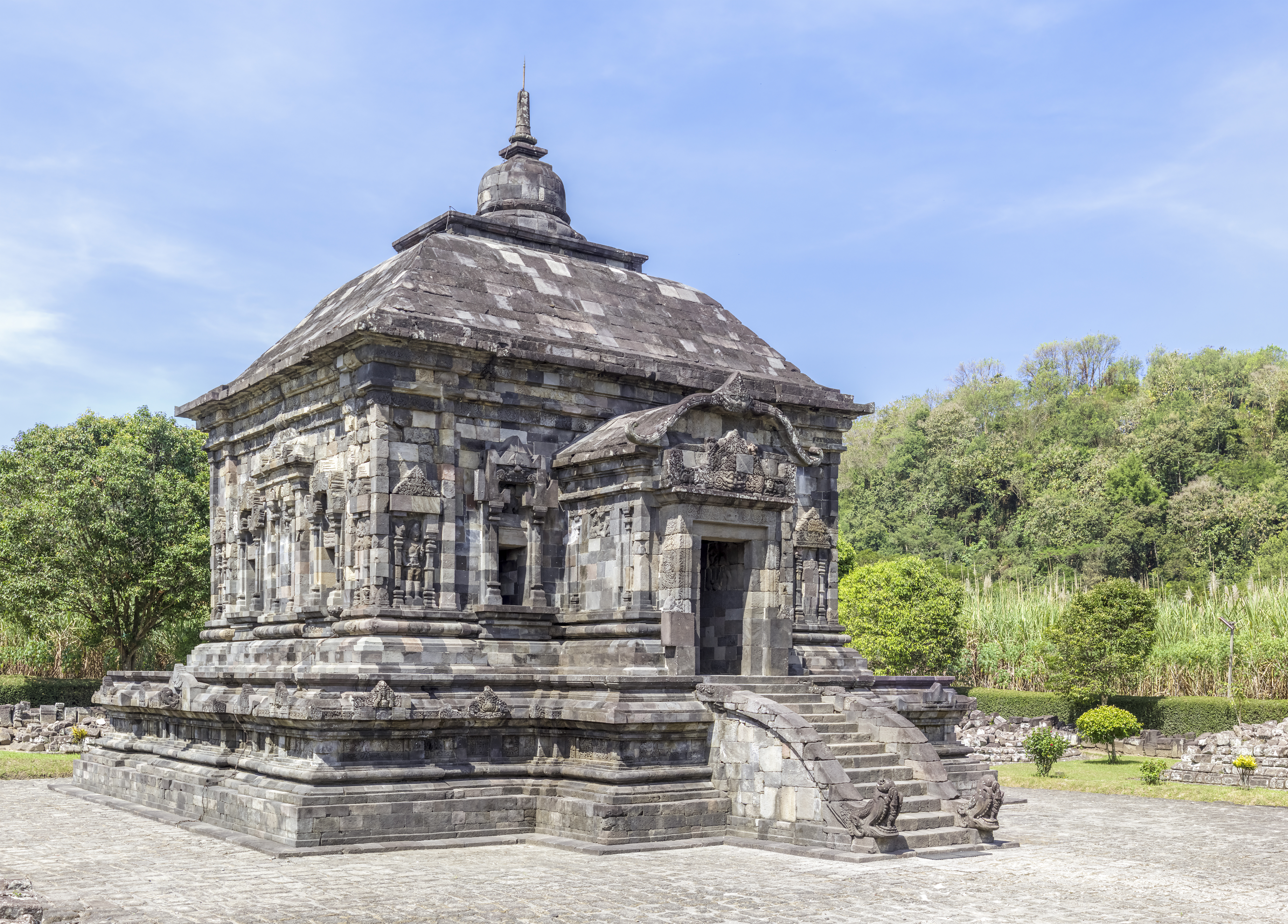
Banyunibo

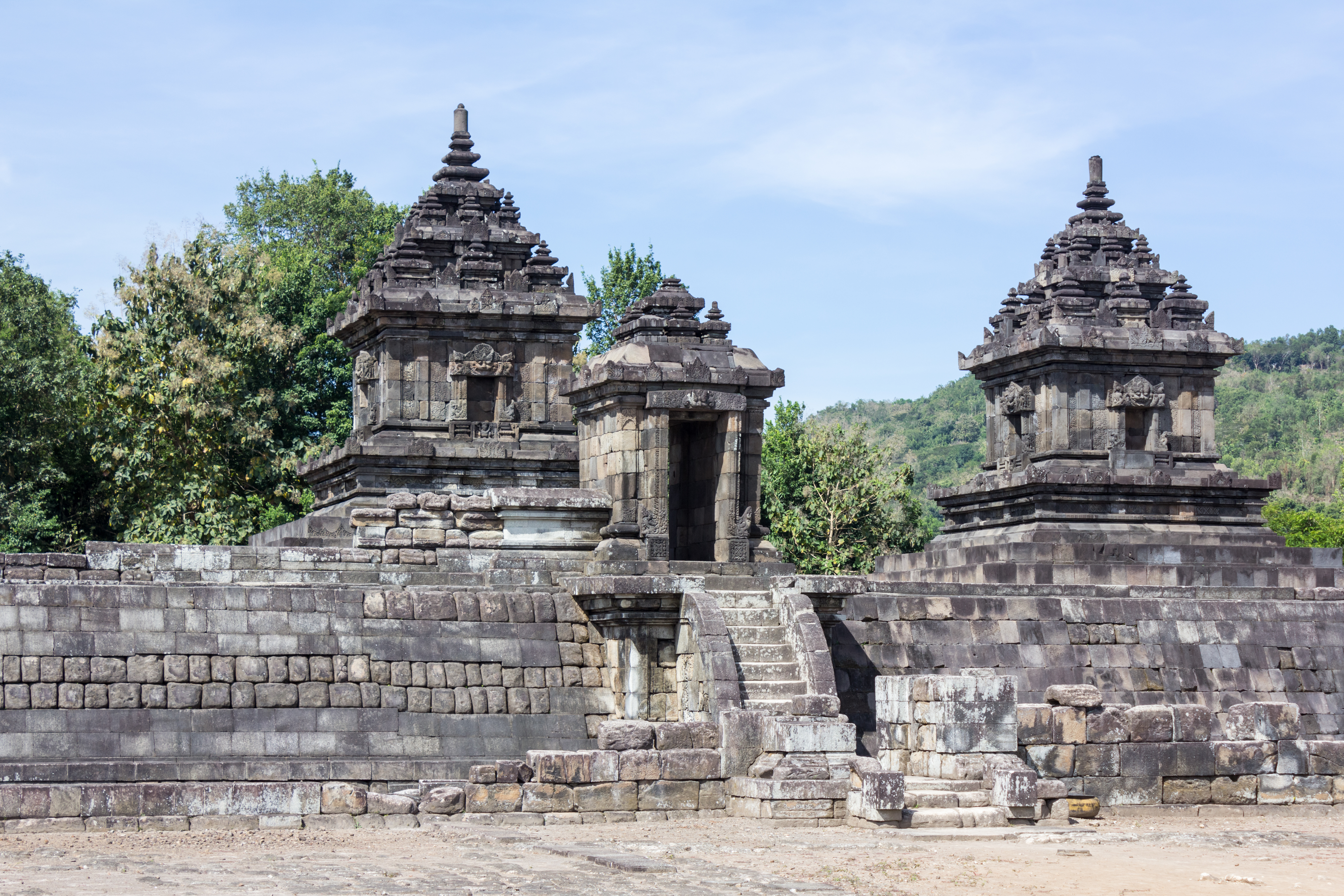
Barong

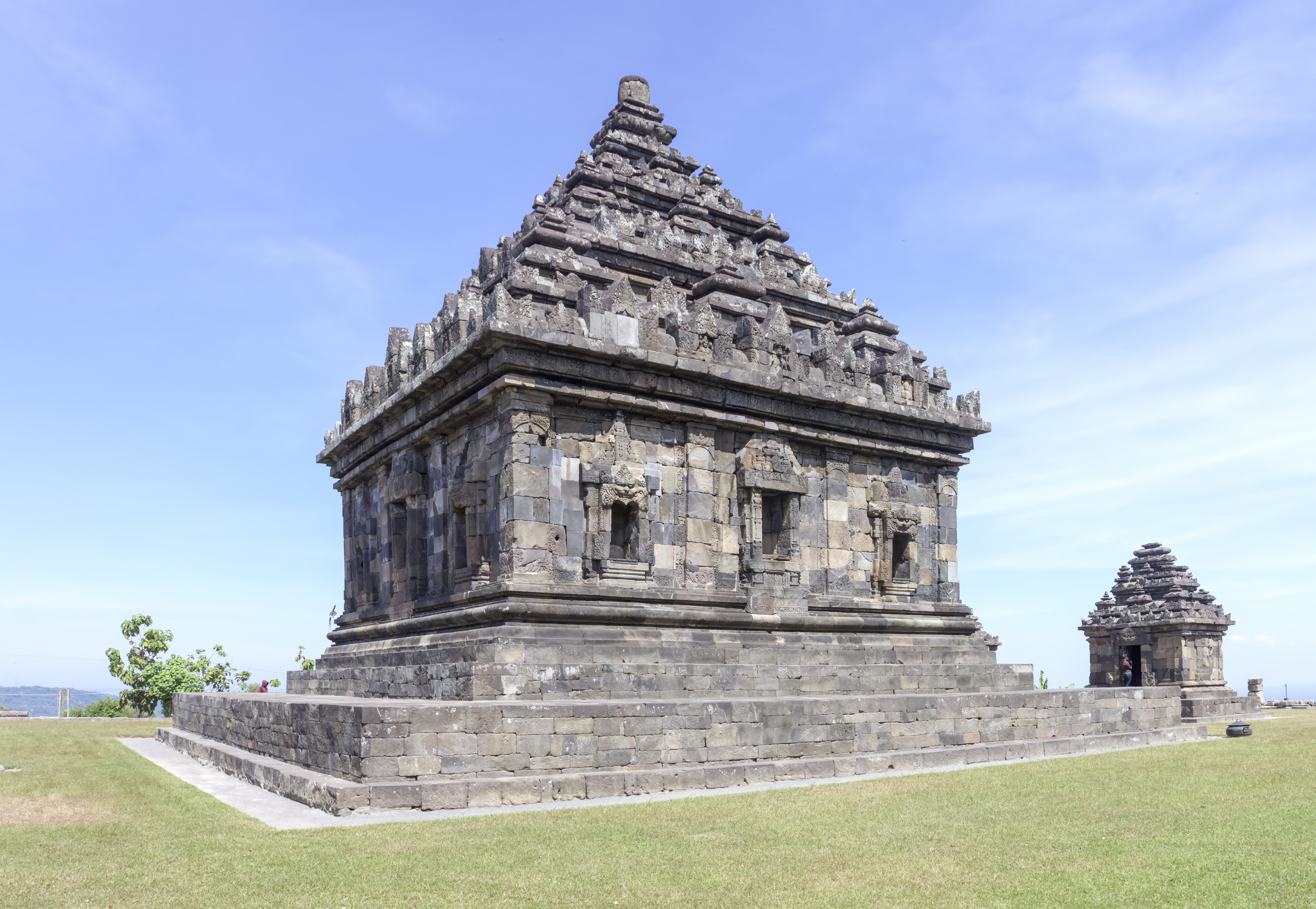
Ijo

== See also ==
- Candi of Indonesia
- Kedu Plain
