= Kimpulan =

Hindu temple in Indonesia

Coordinates: 7.6884°S 110.4154°E

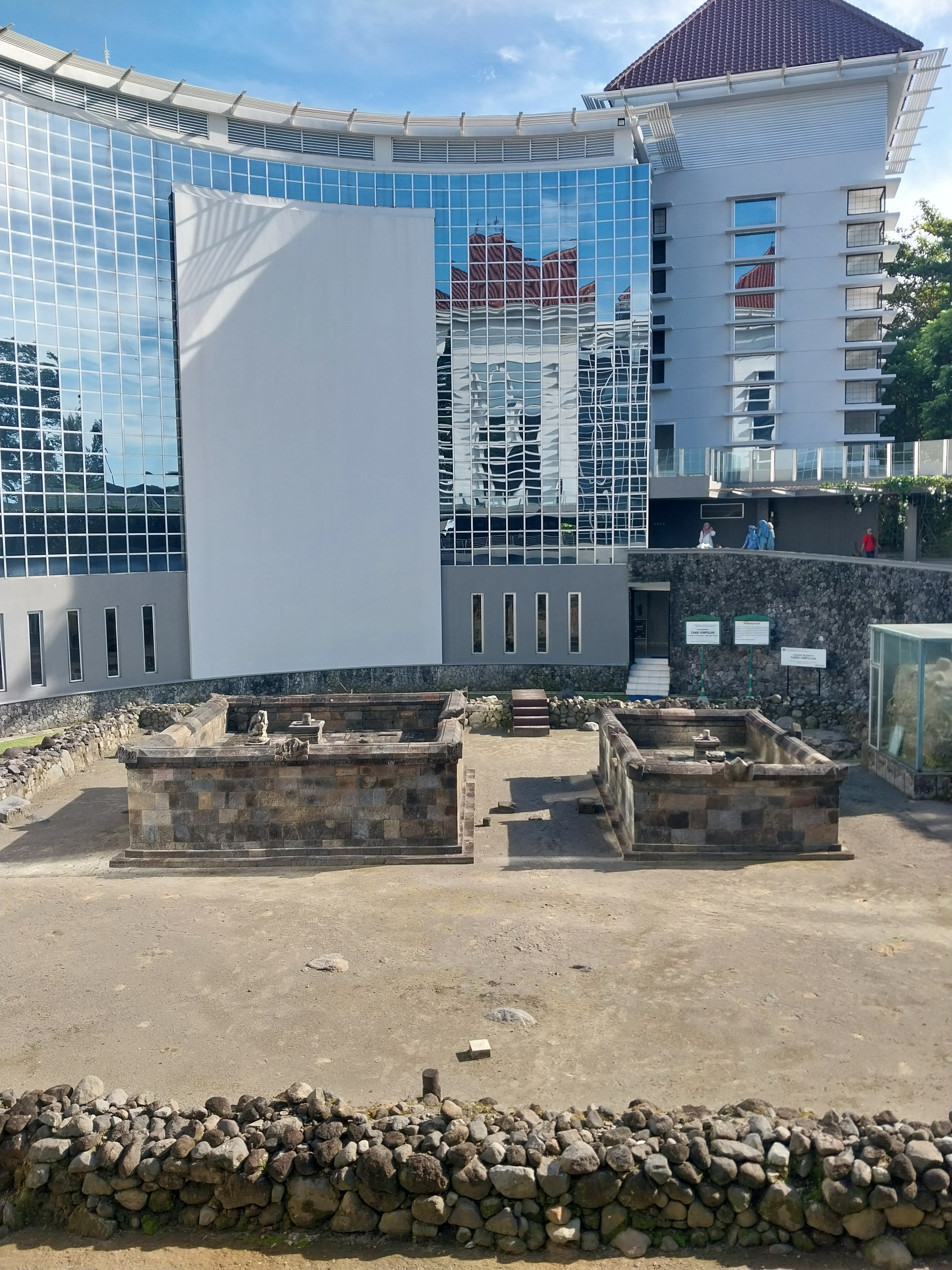
- Kimpulan temple in 2025

- Location within Java Kimpulan (Indonesia)
- Location: Kimpulan, Umbulmartani, Ngemplak, Sleman Regency, Special Region of Yogyakarta

History
- Built: 9–10 CE

Kimpulan (Javanese: ꦕꦤ꧀ꦝꦶꦏꦶꦩ꧀ꦥꦸꦭꦤ꧀, romanized: Candhi Kimpulan; also known as Pustakasala temple) is a 9th to 10th century Hindu temple located in the area of Islamic University of Indonesia (UII) library in Kaliurang road, Sleman Regency, Special Region of Yogyakarta, Indonesia. The temple was buried about 5 metres (16 ft) underground. Parts of the temple have been excavated to reveal square andesite stone walls and statues of Ganesha, Nandi, and Lingam-Yoni.

== Discovery ==
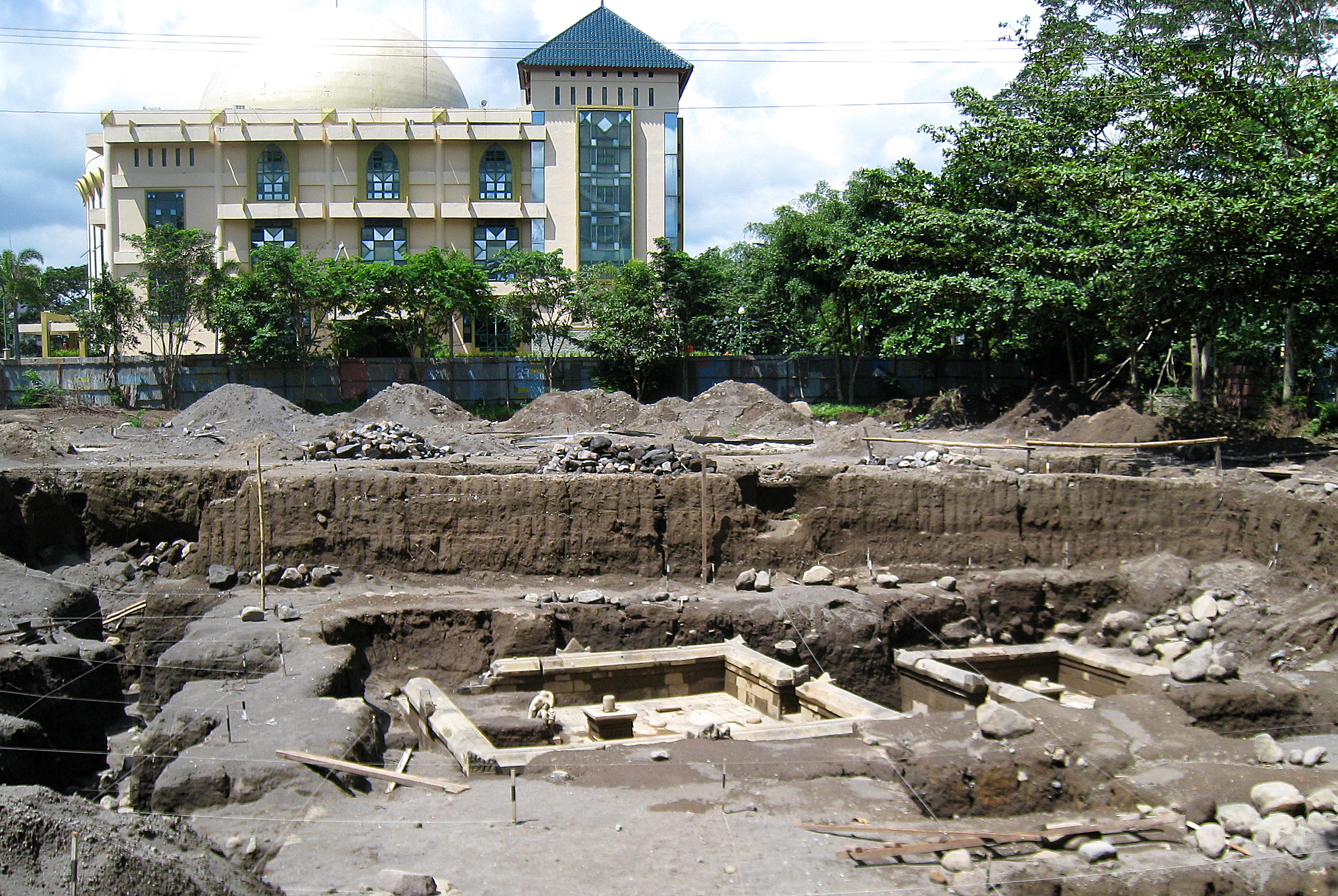
The Pustakasala Hindu temple excavation site in 2010, nearby is the UII's Ulil Albab Mosque.

The temple was accidentally discovered on 11 December 2009 during land excavations to lay foundations for the construction of a new university library. The discovery drew public attention and sparked excitement and curiosity. The news instantly drew many visitors to the site. The Archaeology office (BP3) in Yogyakarta feared that large numbers of curious visitors would harm the excavation site, and feared looting might take place. So to prevent harm to the site, the area was surrounded with tin fences and closed; it is off-limits for visitors.

Like the temples of Sambisari, Morangan and Kedulan, the temple is thought to have been buried by an ancient volcanic eruption from the nearby Mount Merapi about a millennium ago. The discovery of this temple was the most exciting archaeological finding in Yogyakarta recently, leading to speculation about whether other ancient temples still lie underground in the vicinity, buried under Mount Merapi's volcanic ash.

== History ==
Further study and archaeological excavation of the site by the Yogyakarta Archaeological office is in progress. So far, the temple clearly shows it is of Hindu Shaivite nature, and the style of carving and statues strongly suggests construction took place sometime around the 9th to 10th century, during Mataram kingdom period. It has been postulated that Candi Kimpulan was a part of a network of temples in an area between Borobudur and Prambanan closely linked to wet-rice cultivation.

During the discovery, the temple was known to the public as Candi UII (Universitas Islam Indonesia temple), because it was discovered on the UII campus grounds. Later, the Archaeological Office of Yogyakarta (BP3) named the temple Candi Kimpulan after Kimpulan village, the location of the site. However the UII Wakf Foundation Board suggested another name; Pustakasala which means "library" in Sanskrit. The suggested name was meant to emphasize its history of discovery, as the temple site was originally meant to be the university library. The name "Pustakasala" was also chosen to emphasize the educational nature of the university. Moreover, the Ganesha statue was discovered in the site, and in Java, Ganesha is traditionally known as the god of learning, intellect, wisdom, and knowledge.

== Architecture ==
The temple is clearly a Hindu Shaivite temple. However the temple architecture is quite unusual for a temple dated from this time period. Unlike common Central Java Hindu temples, the stone main structure and towering roof are absent. The main temple is modestly small in size and has simple decorations. It only consists of several squares of walled stone base and staircases with the carving of Kala. The inner chambers contain statues of Ganesha, Nandi, and Lingam-Yoni.

So far, experts suggest that the history and architecture of this temple is a modest one. The body, column, and roof of the temple probably were made from wood or some organic material that has decayed over time and left no traces. The temple was probably similar to present day Balinese temples with a tall Meru-style roof. Unlike the magnificent and richly decorated Prambanan temple that served as the royal national temple of the Mataram Kingdom, Kimpulan was a modest village shrine built by the common people of a village on the outskirts of the capital.

== See also ==
- Candi of Indonesia
- Hinduism in Java
