= Barong Temple =

Building in Central Java, Indonesia

Barong ꦧꦫꦺꦴꦁ
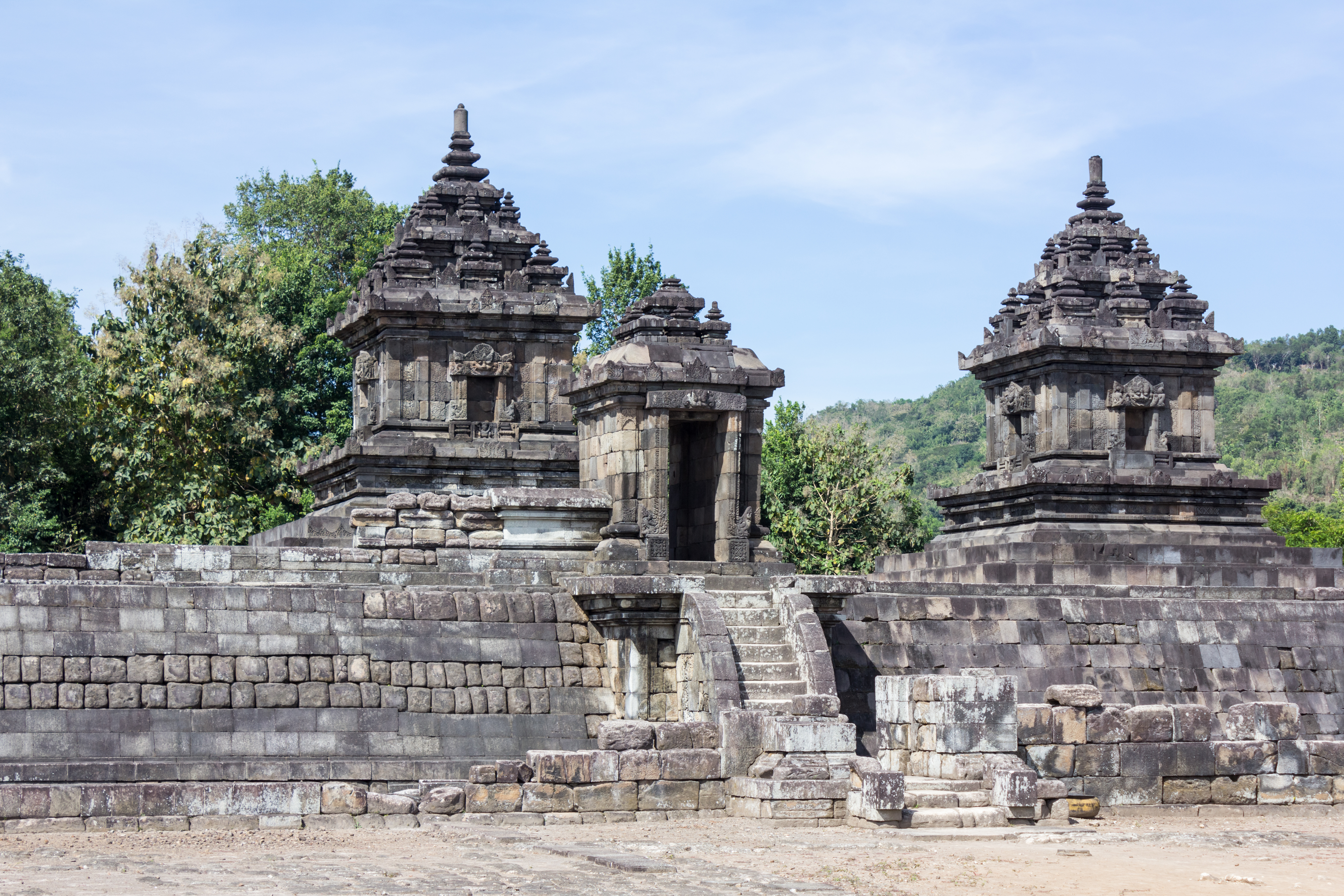
- The gate of Barong temple and its two main buildings

- Location within Java Location within Indonesia

General information
- Architectural style: Hindu candi
- Location: near Yogyakarta (city), Yogyakarta, Indonesia
- Coordinates: 7.7754785°S 110.4972972°E
- Completed: circa 9th century
- Client: Sailendra or Mataram kingdom

Technical details
- Structural system: interlocking andesite stone masonry

Barong temple (Indonesian: Candi Barong; Javanese: ꦕꦤ꧀ꦝꦶꦧꦫꦺꦴꦁ, romanized: Candhi Barong) is a 9th-century Hindu candi (temple) located approximately 800 meters east-southeast from Ratu Boko compound. The temple is located on a hill in Candisari hamlet, Bokoharjo village, Prambanan subdistrict, Sleman Regency, Yogyakarta, Indonesia. The temple is named barong according to its kala's head carving on top of the niches of its temples that resembles Barong.

== Architecture ==
Unlike the other temples in Central Java, Barong Temple took shape as a stepped terraces locally known as punden berundak, which was an ancient design of pre-Hindu megalithic sacred structure in Java. This temple consists of three-level terraces. The first terrace is located on the west corresponds to the site topography, the second terrace is a stone structure measures is 90 x 63 square metres, while the third terrace measured 50 x 50 square metres. The entrance is located on the west side. In the middle of the west side there is a staircase up from the first terrace to the second terrace ascending about 4 metres high with the causeway width of 3 metres.

== See also ==
- Candi of Indonesia
- Kewu Plain
- Prambanan
- Ratu Boko
- Banyunibo
- Ijo
- Hinduism in Java
