= Ijo Temple =

Hindu temple in Indonesia

Ijo ꦆꦗꦺꦴ
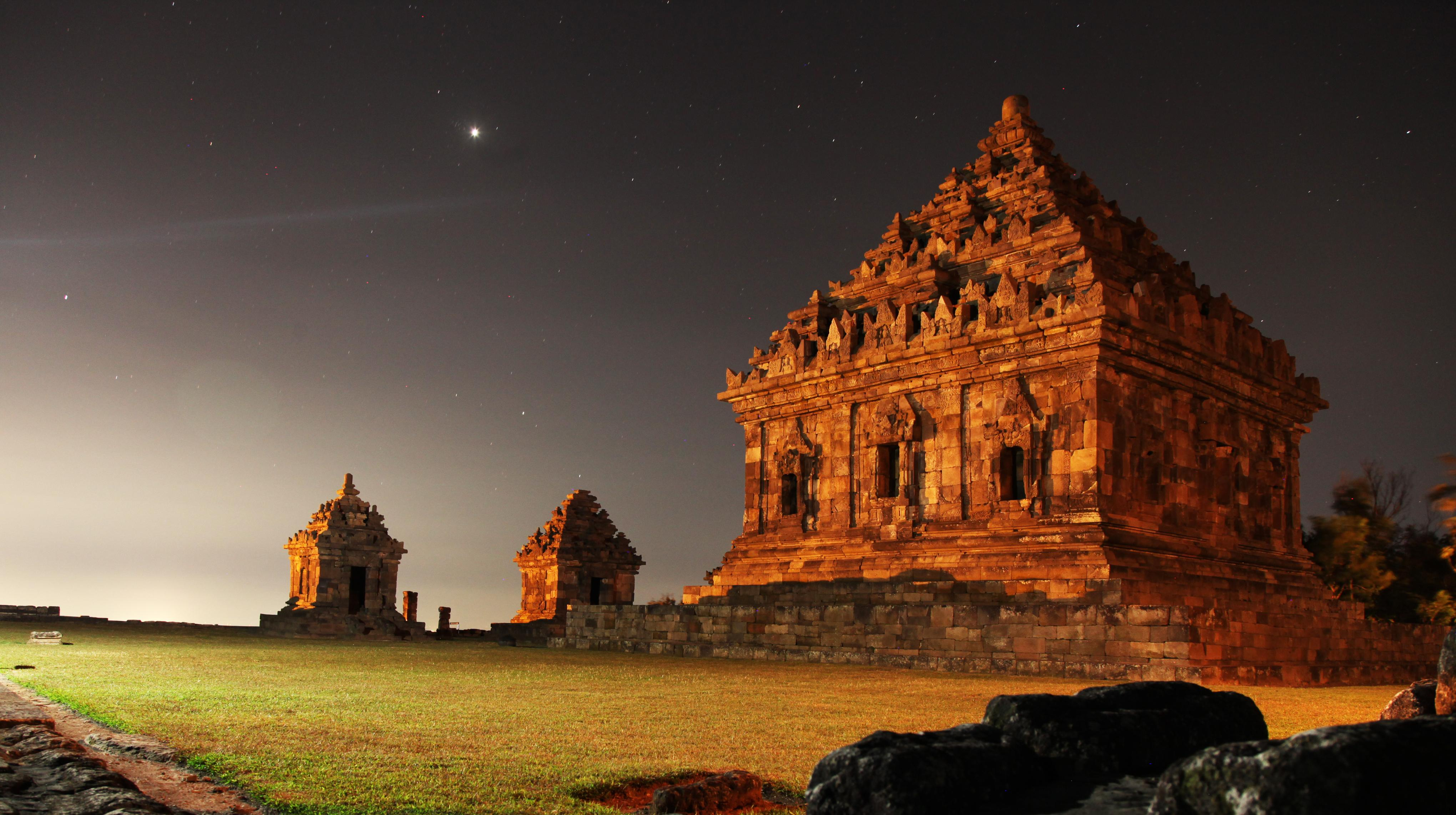
- Ijo located on the hill southeast from Ratu Boko

- Location within Indonesia

General information
- Architectural style: Hinduism candi
- Location: Yogyakarta, Indonesia
- Coordinates: 7°47′2″S 110°30′44″E
- Completed: 10th to 11th century
- Client: Mataram Kingdom

Ijo temple (Indonesian: Candi Ijo; Javanese: ꦕꦤ꧀ꦝꦶꦆꦗꦺꦴ, romanized: Candhi Ijo) is a Hindu candi (temple) located 4 kilometers from Ratu Boko or around 18 kilometers east from Yogyakarta, Indonesia. The temple was built between 10th to 11th century CE during the Mataram kingdom period.

== Location ==
The temple compound is located in Groyokan hamlet, Sambirejo village, Kecamatan Prambanan, Sleman Regency, Yogyakarta. The temple's name derived from its location, the Gumuk Ijo hill. The temple compound stood on western slope of the hill, in a quiet region east of Yogyakarta, around 4 kilometers southeast from Ratu Boko archaeological compound. The temple elevation is 410 meters above the sea level. The western hill of Gumuk Ijo overlooks rice paddies, villages and Adisucipto International Airport.

The temple compound measures 0.8 hectares, however the original temple compound is estimated to be far larger. On the hill foot and slopes on western sides there are some archaeological artifacts and temple ruins which suggest the larger compound may exists from the foot ascending to the main temple.

== Architecture ==
=== Temple compound ===
The temple compound is estimated to span west to east according to hill's topography; from the foot hill in the west ascending to the main temple on the higher ground on the hill. The temple compound consists of several terraces. On the western part some temple ruins were discovered, most of them are being excavated. It was estimated that more than 10 Perwara or lesser temples ruins are still buried in this terraces.

=== Temples ===
==== Perwara temples ====
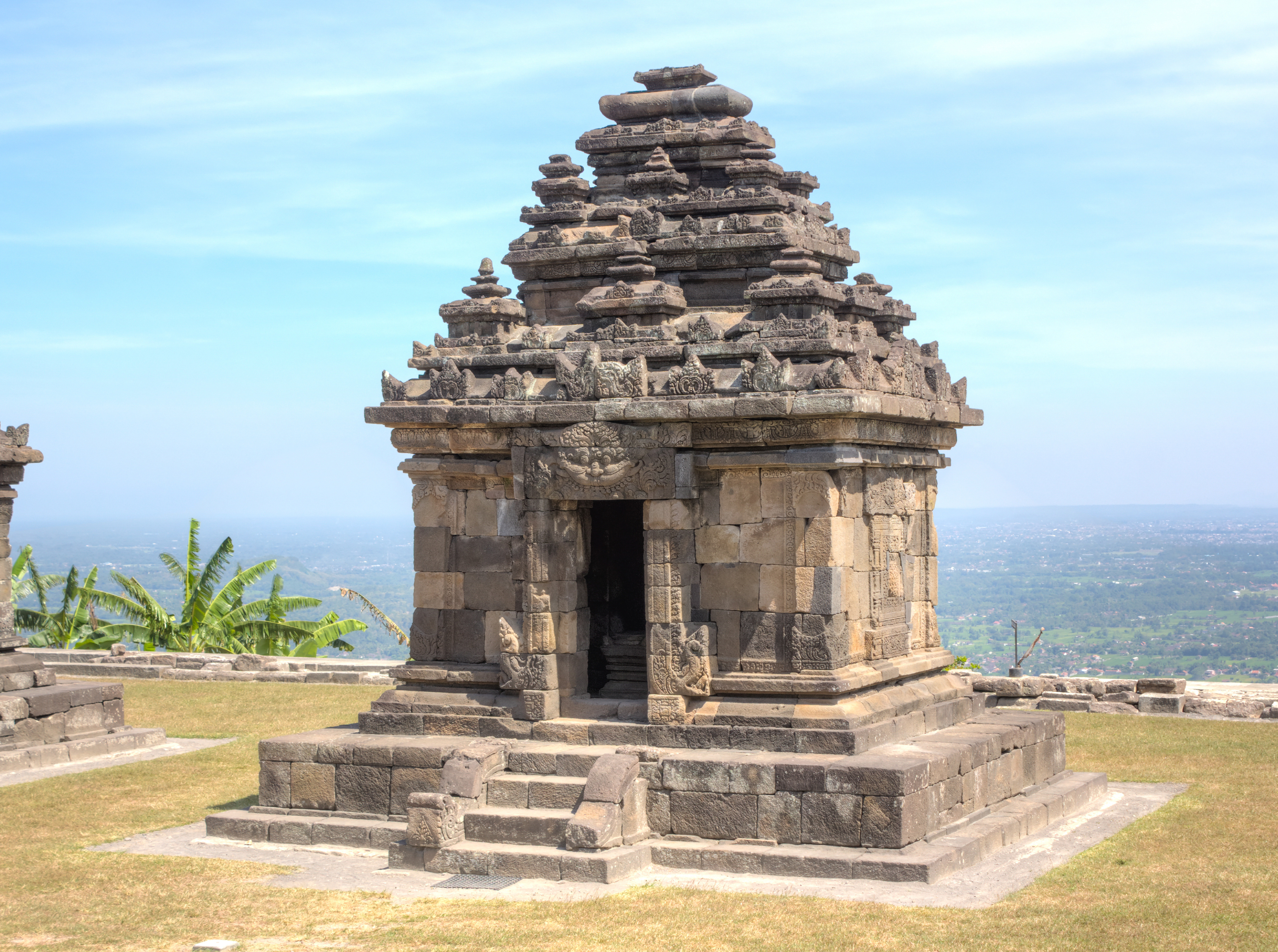
One of three perwara temples.

The main temple compound located on the uppermost terrace, consists of a large main temple facing west and three perwara temples on front of it facing east. The three perwara temples was meant to honor Trimurti, the three highest gods in Hinduism: Brahma, Vishnu and Shiva. All of these three temples having cella or room and there are windows perforated in the rhombus shape. The roof is arranged in three stages adorned with rows of ratnas.

==== Main temple ====
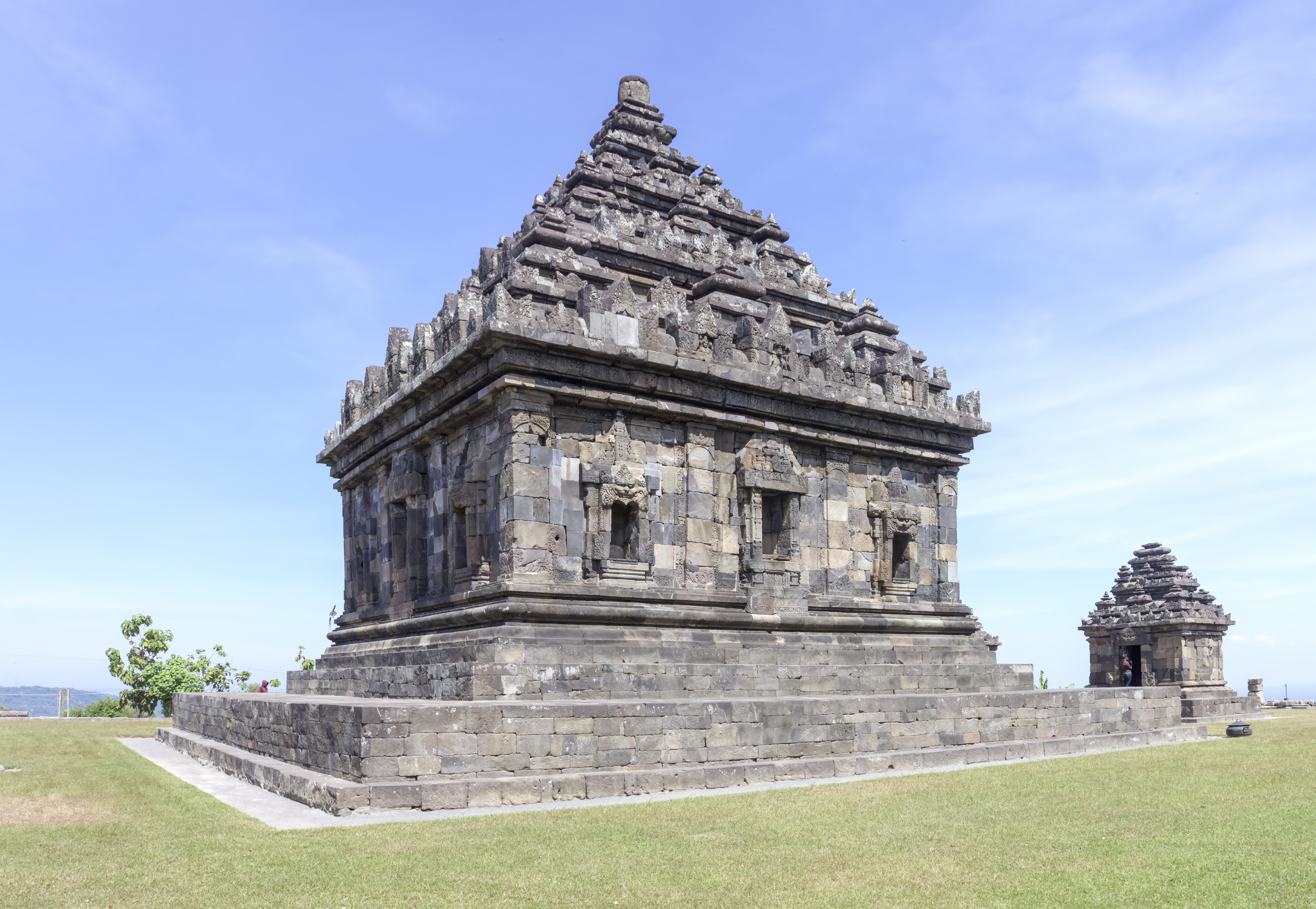
The main temple, showing the three niches. One of the perwara temples can be seen behind it.

The main temple has square ground plan. The entrance into the garbhagriha (main room) is located on west side, flanked with two false window, or niches adorned with kala-makara decoration. On the north, east, and southern walls there are three niches on each side also adorned in kala-makara style. The center niche are slightly higher than other two flanking niches. These niches are now empty, probably these niches once contains Hindu murti (statues).

A flight of stairs flanked with two makaras were designed to reach the main door that is 1.2 meters above the ground. On top of the door there are carving of Kala's head connected to makaras body on each side of the gate. These kala-makara pattern is commonly found in temples of ancient Java. Inside the makara's mouth there are small parrots carved.

Inside the main chamber there is a large linga and yoni adorned with naga serpent. The union of phallic linga and yoni symbolize the cosmic sacred union between Shiva and Parvati as his shakti. There are three niches on each sides of inner wall in the room, each niches flanked with a pair of devata, Hindu lesser gods and goddesses flying toward the niches.

The roof of main temple is arranged in three ascending terraces decreased in size to the top forming stepped pyramid. On each sides there are 3 ratnas on each step, a larger ratna crowning the roof. On the margin between temple body and the roof adorned with floral patterns and gana (dwarf). On the edge of the roof there are antefixes with floral frames, inside the antefix there are images of Hindu gods bust with hand position holding flowers.

== See also ==
- Candi of Indonesia
- Kewu Plain
- Prambanan
- Ratu Boko
- Banyunibo
- Hinduism in Java
