= Banyunibo =

9th-century Buddhist site in Indonesia

Banyunibo ꦧꦚꦸꦤꦶꦧ
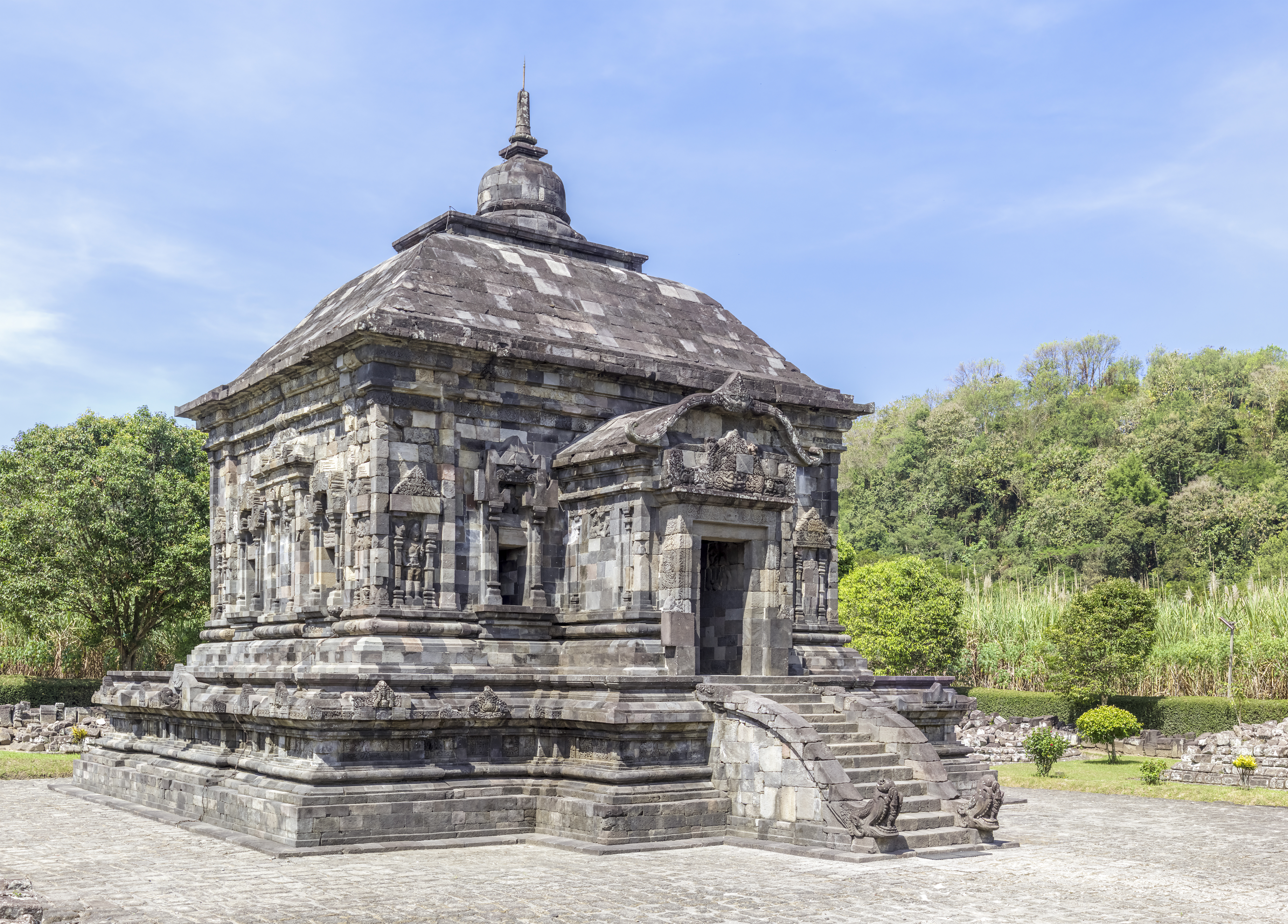
- Banyunibo located in the center of paddy field southeast of Ratu Boko

- Location within Indonesia

General information
- Architectural style: Buddhist candi
- Location: near Yogyakarta (city), Yogyakarta, Indonesia
- Coordinates: 7°46′40″S 110°29′38″E
- Completed: circa 9th century
- Client: Sailendra or Mataram kingdom

Banyunibo (Javanese: ꦧꦚꦸꦤꦶꦧ, romanized: Banyuniba, lit. 'dripping water') is a 9th-century Buddhist temple located in Cepit hamlet, Bokoharjo village, Prambanan, Sleman Regency, Special Region of Yogyakarta, Indonesia. The temple, dating from the era of Mataram kingdom, sits in a narrow valley surrounded by paddy fields about two kilometers southeast of the Ratu Boko archaeological park on the east side of modern Yogyakarta. Further north is the Prambanan temple, and to the south are the Gunung Sewu Hills, an extension of Gunung Kidul Hills.

== Architecture ==
Banyunibo has a curved rooftop design crowned with a solitary stupa; this theme is unique among the surviving Buddhist temples of Central Java. The curved rooftop was either meant to symbolize lotus or padma petals or meant to mimic the organic roof made from ijuk fibres (black fibres surrounding the trunk of Arenga pinnata) common in ancient Java vernacular architecture and also found today in Balinese temple roof architecture. The main structure was originally surrounded by stupas at ground level, the foundations of which can still be seen today. The stupas' foundations are arranged in a row of three stupas on the south side of the temple, and three stupas on the east side. The northern side probably also contains the base of three stupas, however, it is still buried under a meter thick of earth. The main temple is facing west.

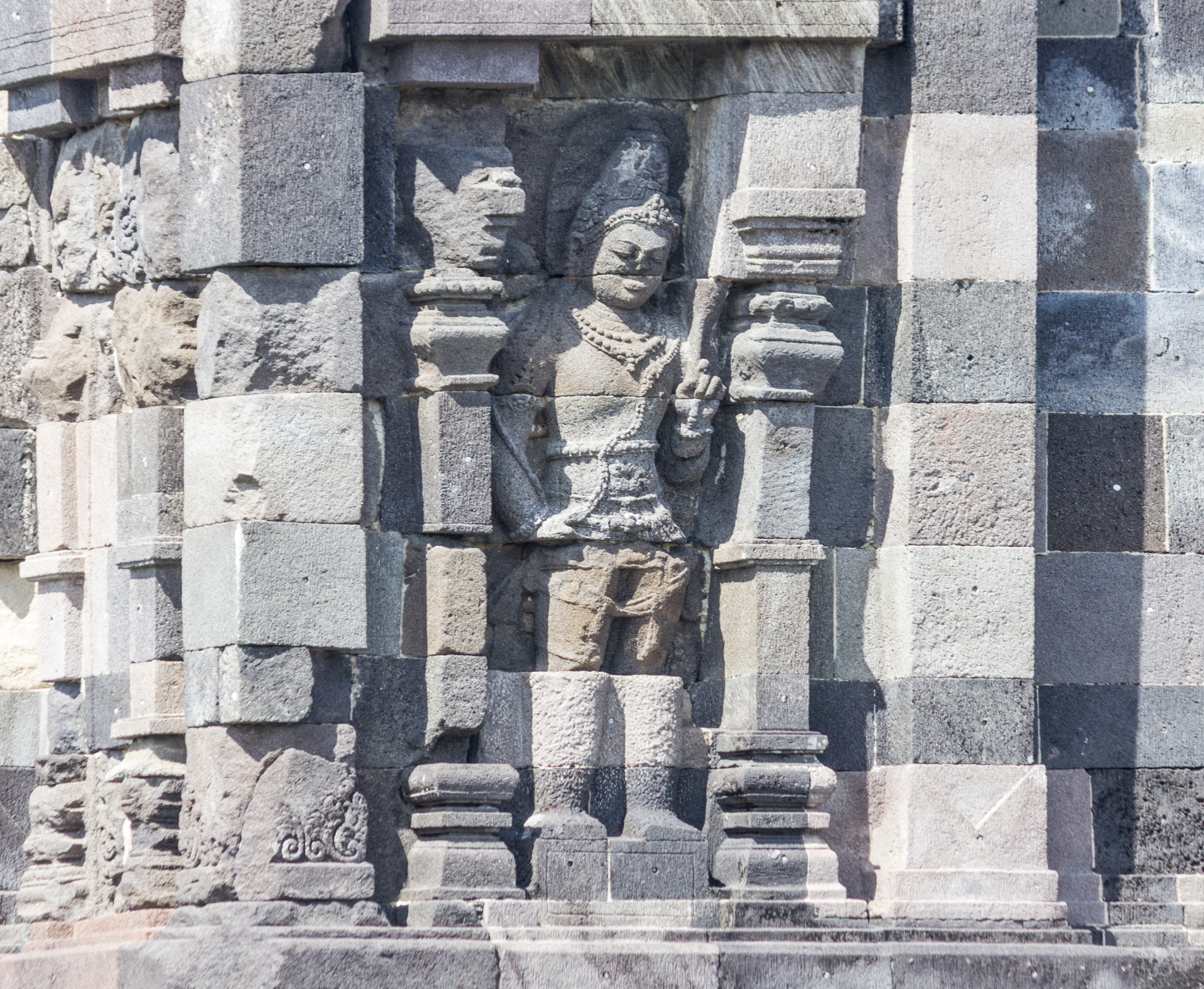
Temple reliefs

The stairs and the portal of the temple are adorned with typical Kala-Makara style, typical of ancient Central Javanese temples dated from this period. Makara is located on each side of the stair and Kala head is located on top of the portals. The niches surrounding the body of the temple are adorned with the images of Bodhisattvas, while the niches upon the windows are adorned with the images of taras with each hand holding flowers. The inner wall is adorned with the image of Hariti surrounded by children (some parts of this relief are missing) and Vaisravana. The inner wall also adorned with a bald male figure underneath an umbrella being upheld by servants, suggests that it may represent one of the temple's patrons.

The collapsed ruins of Banyunibo were discovered in November 1940. Research continued until 1942 and succeeded in reconstructing the roof and the portal section of the temple. The reconstruction was halted due to World War II and the Indonesian National Revolution. In 1962 the restoration of the sub-basement, foot, and wall section of the temple, as well as the north wall, was finished. The reconstruction of the Banyunibo temple was completed in 1978.

== Gallery ==
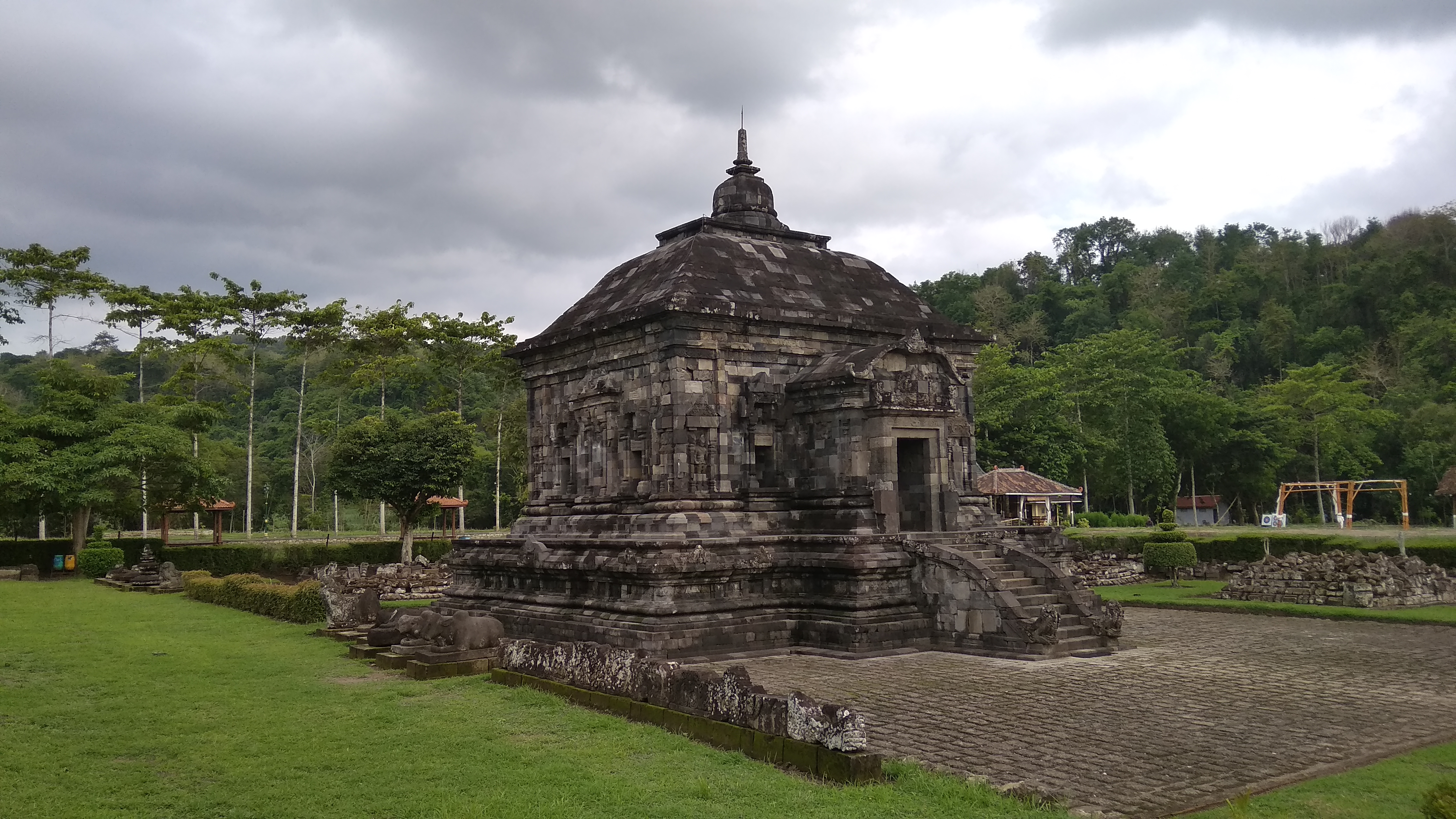
The main temple

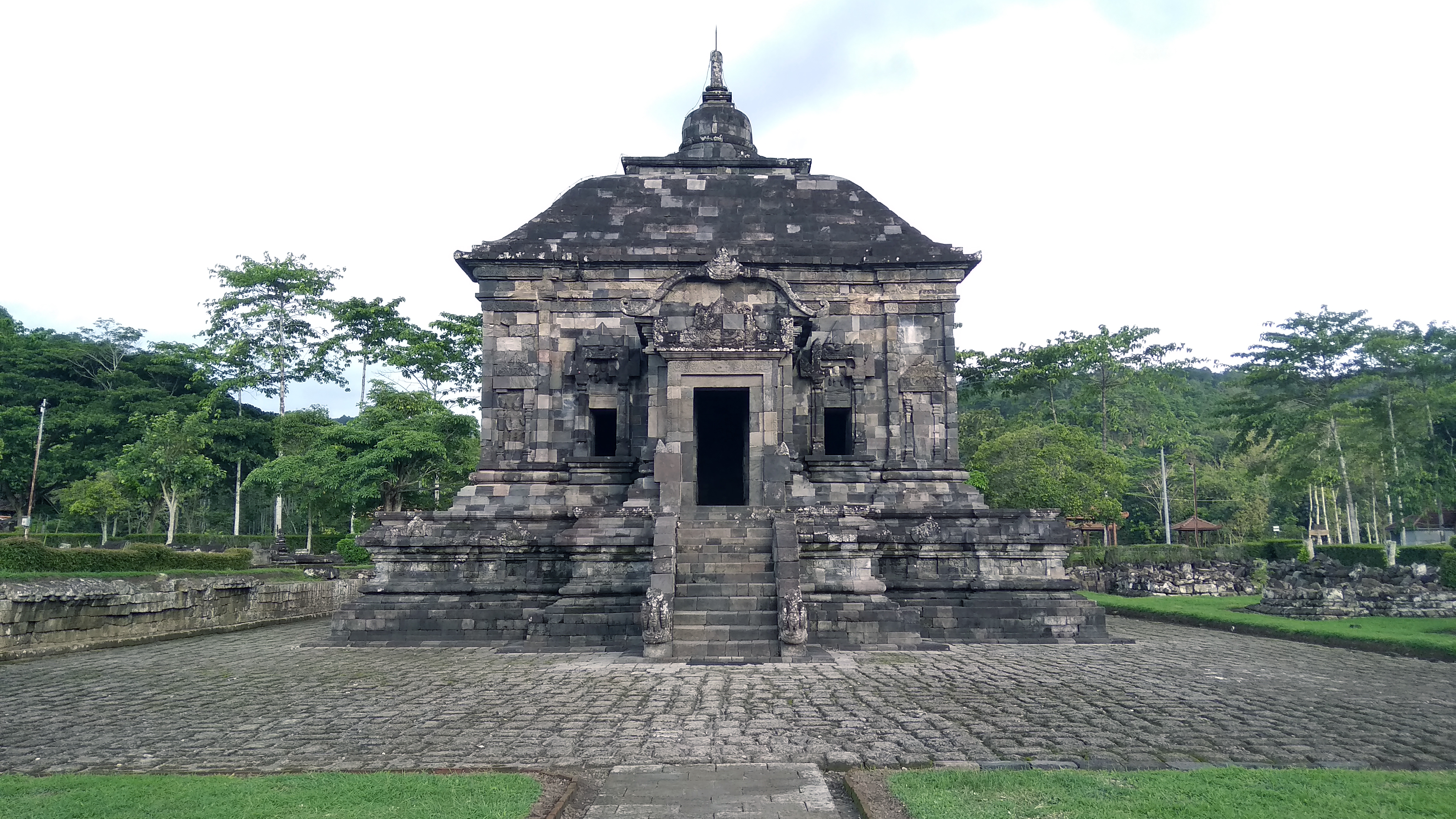
The main temple

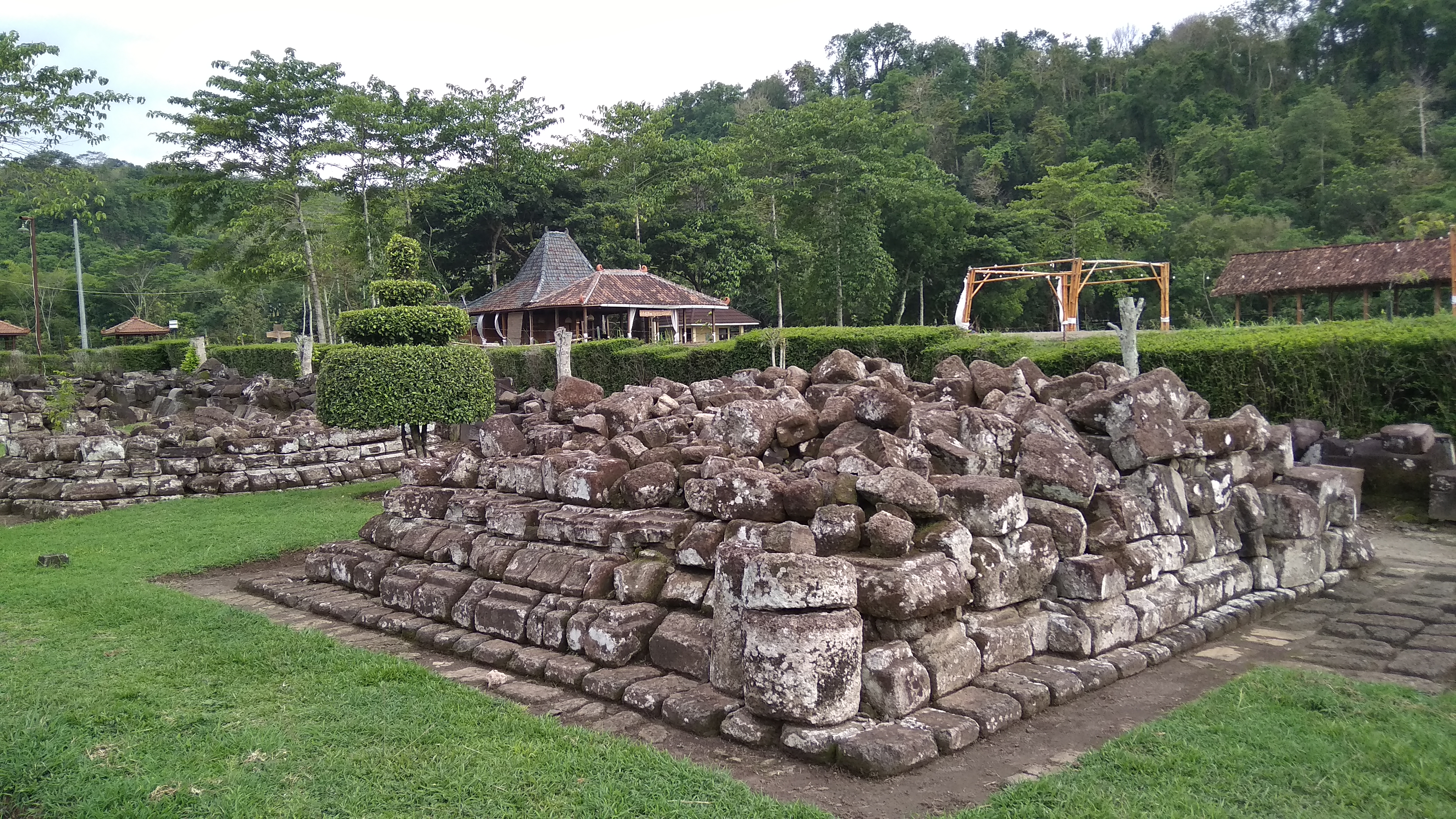
Perwara temple

== Location ==
wikimapia

== See also ==
- Borobudur
- Buddhism in Indonesia
- Candi of Indonesia
- Candi Mendut
- Candi Pawon
- Indonesian Esoteric Buddhism
- Prambanan Plain
