= Ratu Boko =

Archaeological site in Indonesia

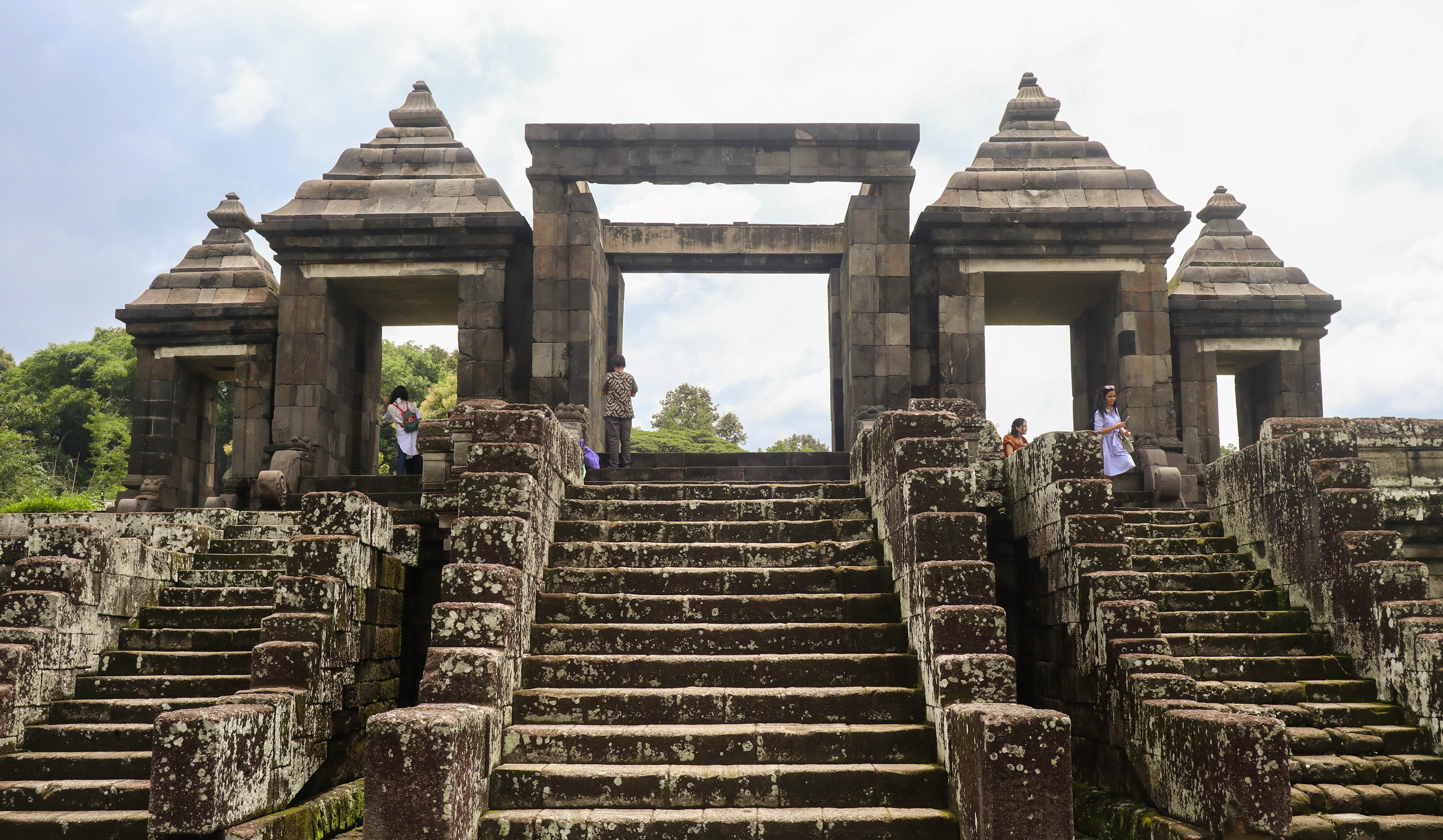
- The gate of Ratu Boko compound

General information
- Architectural style: candi, fortified settlement complex
- Location: near Yogyakarta (city), Yogyakarta, Indonesia
- Coordinates: 7°46′12″S 110°29′20″E
- Completed: circa 9th century
- Client: Sailendra or Mataram kingdom

Ratu Boko (Javanese: ꦫꦠꦸꦧꦏ, romanized: Ratu Baka) or Ratu Boko Palace (Javanese: ꦏꦣꦠꦺꦴꦤ꧀ꦫꦠꦸꦧꦏ, romanized: Kadhaton Ratu Baka) is an archaeological site in Java. Ratu Boko is located on a plateau, about three kilometres south of Prambanan temple complex in Yogyakarta, Indonesia. The original name of this site is still unclear, however the local inhabitants named this site after King Boko, the legendary king mentioned in Roro Jonggrang folklore. In Javanese, Ratu Boko means "Stork King".

The site covers 16 hectares in two hamlets (Dawung and Sambireja) of the village of Bokoharjo and Prambanan, Sleman Regency. In striking contrast to other Classic-period sites in Central Java and Yogyakarta, which are remains of Hindu temples, Ratu Boko displays attributes of an occupation or settlement site, although its precise function is unknown. Probably the site was a palace complex which belonged to the Shailendra dynasty or Mataram kingdom that also built temples scattered across the Prambanan Plain. The argument was based on the fact that this complex was not a temple nor a building with a religious nature, but a fortified palace instead which is evidence of a remnant of fortified walls and the dry moat of defensive structures. The remains of settlements were also found in Ratu Boko's vicinity. This site is located 196 m above sea level. On the highest point in the site, there is a small pavilion with a panoramic view of Prambanan with Mount Merapi as the background.

== History ==
According to writer H.J. de Graff, in the 17th century there were many European travelers to Java, who mentioned that there existed an archeological site related to certain King Boko. In 1790, a Dutch researcher, F. Van Boeckholtz was the first to discover the archaeological ruins on top of Ratu Boko Hill. The hill itself is the northwestern branch of the Sewu Mountains, located in the southern part of Central and East Java between Yogyakarta and Tulungagung. The publication of the discovery attracted scientists such as Colin Mackenzie, Franz Wilhelm Junghuhn, and Brumun to conduct research and exploration on the site in the year 1814. In the early 20th century, the Ratu Boko site was thoroughly studied by researcher FDK Bosch, who published his findings in a report entitled "Keraton Van Ratoe Boko". This report concluded that the ruins were the remnant of a kraton "palace". During these researches, Mackenzie also found a statue of a gold-headed man and woman embracing each other. A stone pillar with ornaments of zoomorphic figures among which are elephants, horses, and others, is also found among the ruins.

The 792 Abhayagiri Vihāra inscription is one of the few written evidences discovered in Ratu Boko site. The inscription mentioned Tejahpurnapane Panamkarana or Rakai Panangkaran (746-784), and also mentioned a vihāra located on top of the hill, the Abhayagiri Vihāra, which means "vihāra on top of the hill that free from danger". From this inscription it was concluded that King Panangkaran in a later period of his reign wished for a spiritual refuge and created a vihāra named Abhayagiri Vihāra in 792. Rakai Panangkaran was a pious follower of Mahayana Buddhism, a Dhyani Buddha statue was discovered on the site, which confirmed its initial Buddhist nature. Nevertheless, some Hindu elements are also found at the site, such as the discovery of statues of Hindu deities: Durga, Ganesha and Yoni.

It seems that the compound was later converted to a hilltop fortress by a local landlord named Rakai Walaing Pu Kumbayoni. According to the Shivagrha inscription issued by Rakai Kayuwangi on 12 November 856, the place was used as a defensive fort, consisting of hundreds of stacked stones. The hilltop fortress was used as a fort during a power struggle in the later days of the Mataram Kingdom.

The Ratu Boko complex consists of gopura (gates), paseban, pools, pendhapa, pringgitan, kaputren (women's quarter), and meditation caves.

== Archaeological remains ==
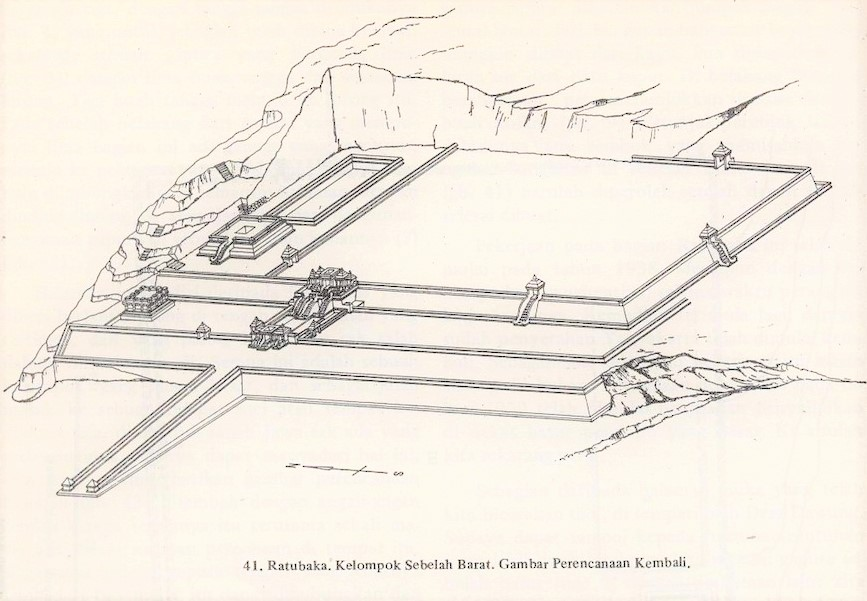
Plan of west part of Ratu Baka elevated compound

Ratu Boko stands 196 meters above sea level and covers an area of 250.000 square meters. It is divided into four parts, the central, the west, the southeast and the east. The central section of the compound consists of the main gates, a crematorium temple, a pool, a stone pedestal and the paseban (or audience hall). The southeast part covers the pendopo (attached open pavilion), balai-balai (public hall or building), three miniature temples, a pool and a walled compound popularly named by locals as kaputren (women's quarter).

At Ratu Boko, traces of probable secular structures have been found, which were erected on a plateau divided into terraces, separated from each other by stone walls and stone-faced ramparts (talud). The site was reached by a steep path up the northwest slope of the plateau, in the direction of Prambanan. The structural remains in the terrace at Ratu Boko site consist of places with folk names connected with palaces such as paseban (reception pavilion), pendopo (audience hall) and kaputren (women's quarter). A pool complex lies on a terrace adjoining the east side of the pendopo. A group of artificial caves, probably for meditation, lies to the north, isolated from the rest of the site. These archaeological sites are:

=== Main gate ===
The first of three terraces is reached through a massive gateway built on two levels. On the western edge of this terrace is a high talud of soft white limestone. The second terrace, separated from the first by andesite wall, is reached through a gateway in paduraksa form consisting of three doors, a larger central one flanked by two of lesser dimensions. The third terrace, the largest, contains the richest concentrations of archaeological remains. Another talud and andesite wall separate the third terrace from the second terrace, with another connecting gateway of paduraksa form, this time consisting of five doors, again the central one having larger dimensions than the two which flank it.

It is read on the main gate Panabwara that was written by Rakai Panabwara, descendant of Rakai Panangkaran. He carved his name there in order to legitimate his authority of this palace.

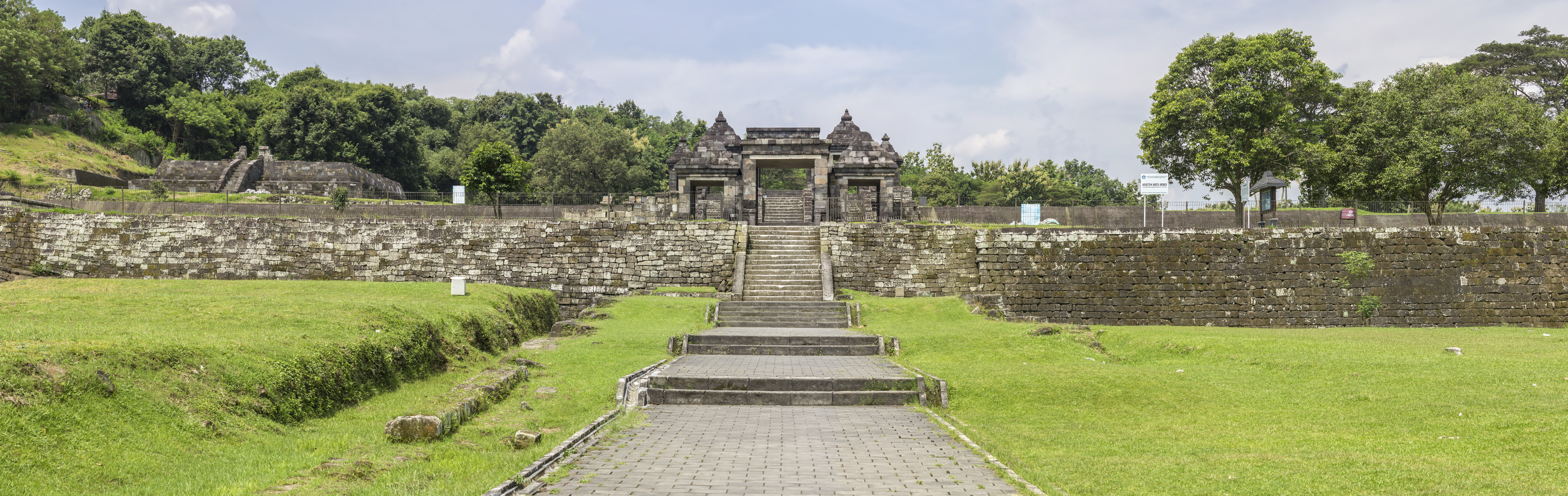
The front gate and walls of the largest terrace, viewed from the front. To the left is the crematorium.

=== Candi Batu Putih ===
Literally, Batu Putih means white stone. It is a structure made from white limestone on the north side of the first row of the gate on second terrace.

=== Candi Pembakaran ===
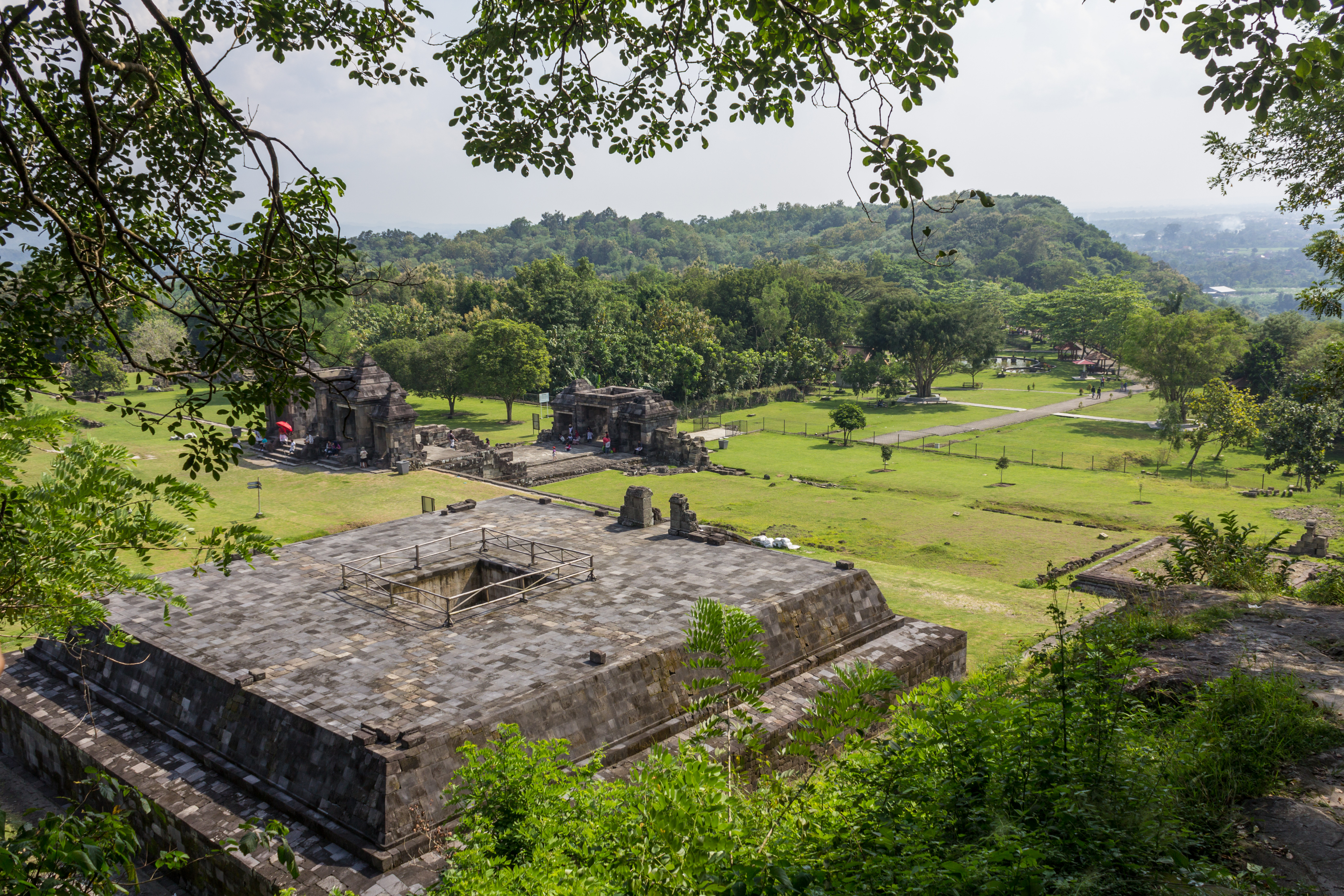
Candi Pembakaran, possibly a crematorium.

Beyond the second row of gates on third terrace, on the north side of the plateau there's a structure similar to the base part of the temple with two terraces about 26x26 m in size. On the center of upper terrace is an empty descending square hole. The building probably functioned as crematorium to burn the corpses.

=== Paseban ===
On the plateau on the third terrace, beside the Candi Pembakaran, there are also several square stone structures. On the structures there are some umpak or stones which serve as the base for wooden columns with holes to support the pillars. These structures are highly suggested as the base of the building, since the pillars, wall, and roof are made from organic material, only the stone floor and base still remain.

=== Pendopo ===
On the second terrace on the southeast side of the plateau, lies the pendopo (audience hall). The pendopo is a square stone enclosure surrounded with andesite stone wall with the small paduraksa entrance gates in the north, west, and south sides. In the center of this walled enclosure is a stone base formed by two separated terraces, the terrace on the southern side is smaller than the northern one. This terrace served as the base and floor of the wooden structure since there are some umpak or stones which serve as the base for wooden columns with holes, to support the pillars. Since the pillars, walls, and the roof were made from easily decaying material, such as wood, sirap (wooden shingles roof) or ijuk, none of it survived. Only the stone bases still remain, while the organic wooden material of the building is gone.

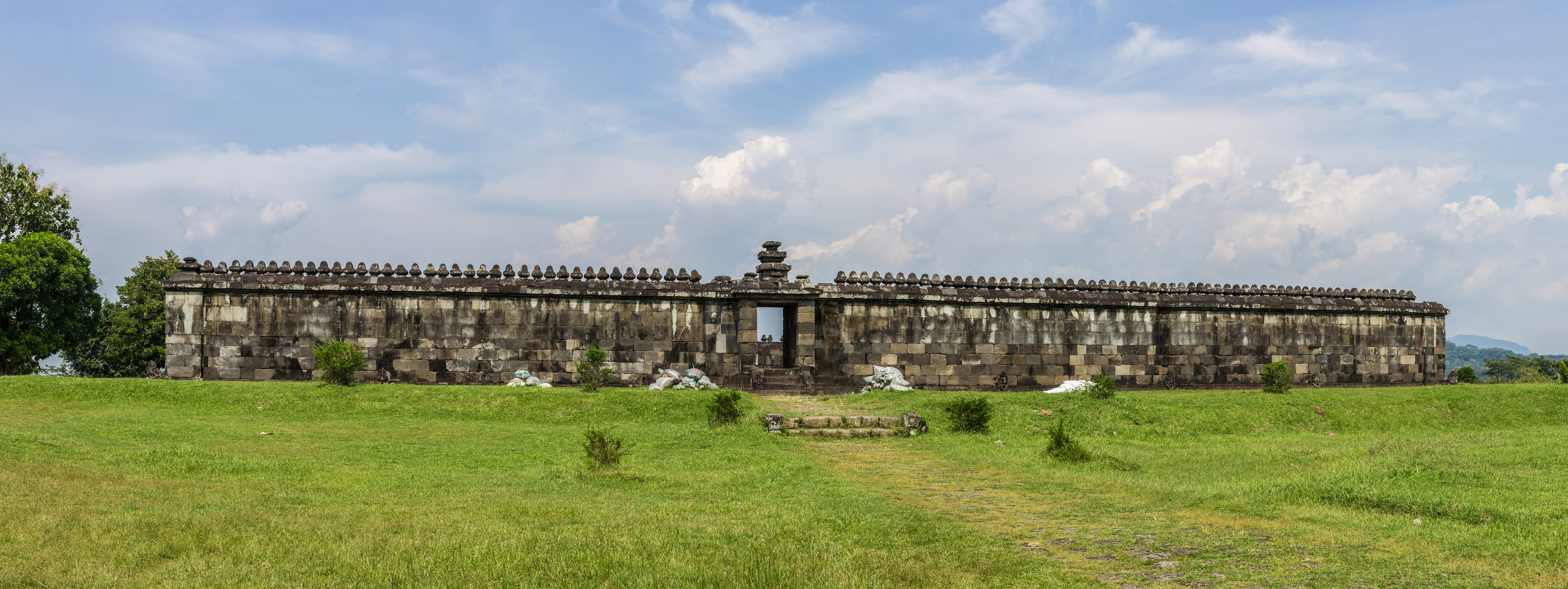
Front view of the pendopo

=== Miniature temples ===
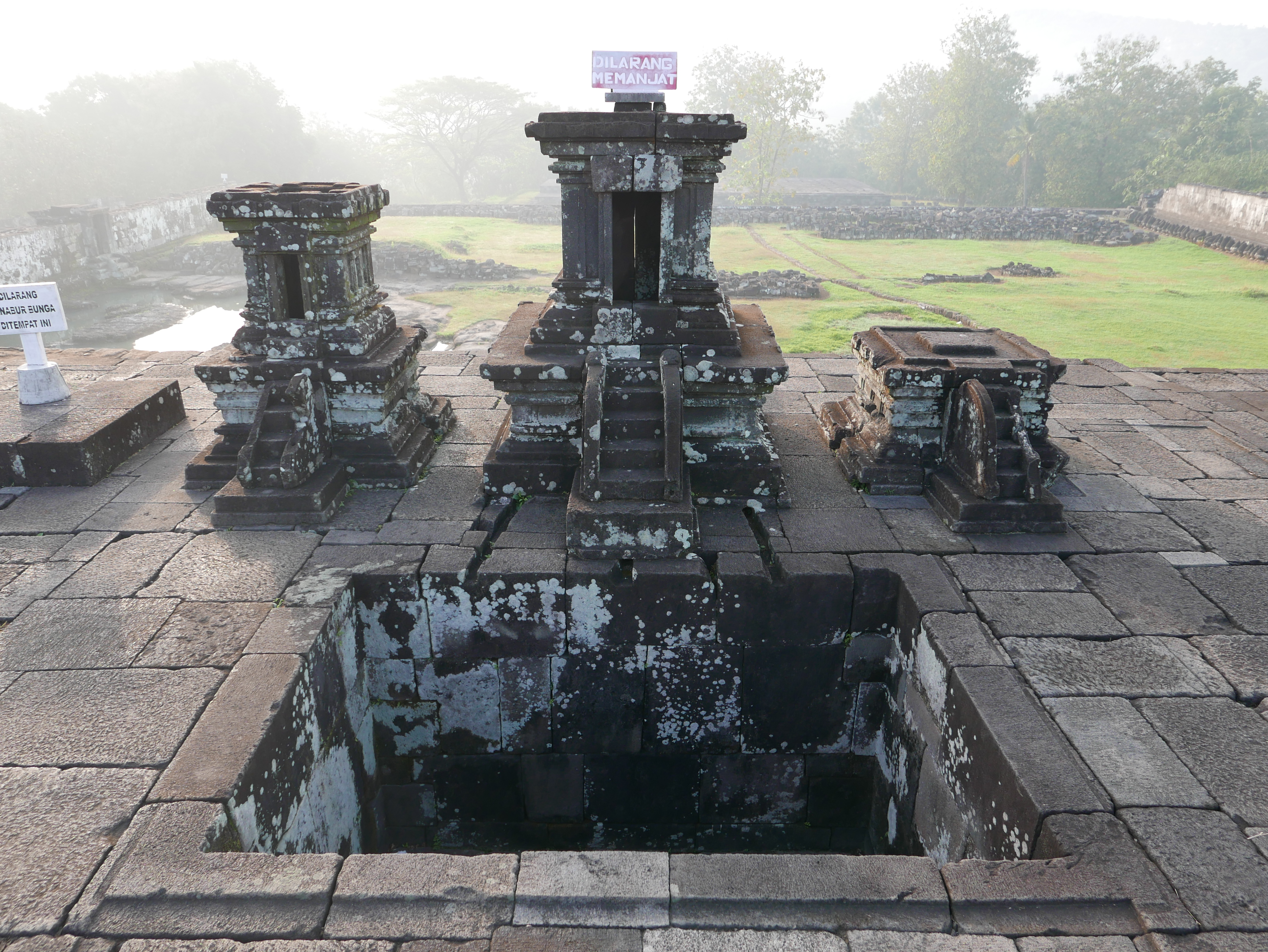
Shrines

On the south side on the pendopo, there are small shrines in the form of three miniature temples with a square stone basin located in front of it. This shrine probably served a religious purpose, as some kind of Hindu or Buddhist shrine in the Ratu Boko complex.

=== Kaputren and bathing place ===
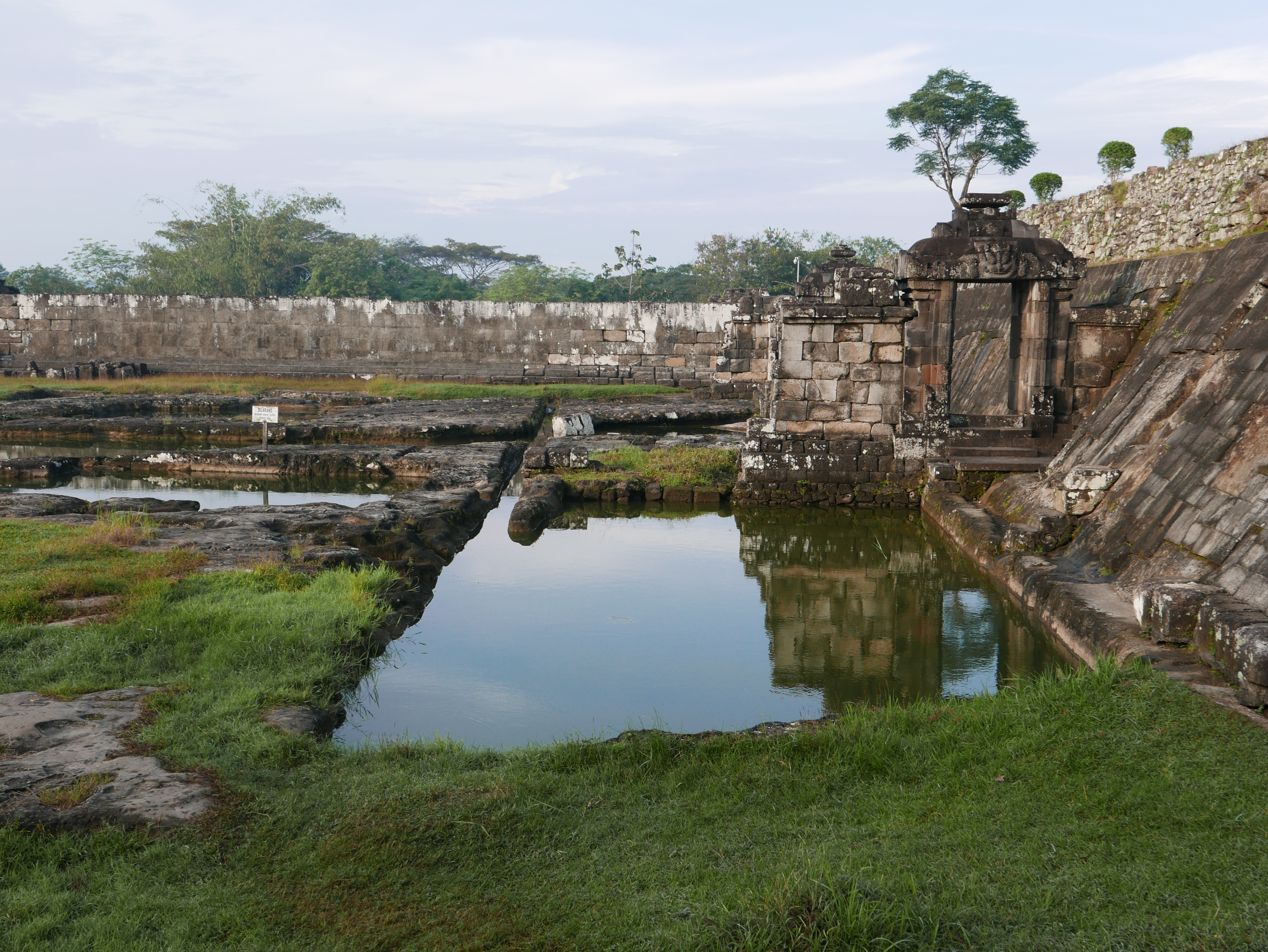
Gates and pool in enclosed kaputren area

On the eastern side of pendopo on the lower terrace, there are several andesite stone walled enclosures with paduraksa gates and a gallery leading to the several pools within. This structure is associated by local folks as kaputren (women's quarter), since the pool is believed to be the pleasure garden for king and his concubines.

One particular pool (or well) within the bath place is considered sacred by Hindu people called 'Amerta Mantana'. It is believed that the water of Amerta brings luck for anyone who uses it. Hindu people use it in Tawur Agung ceremony, one day before the Nyepi day, to support the achievement of self purify and to return the earth into her initial harmony.

To the east of the pool there are two stone base structures, yet again probably the remains of a wooden building, of which only the stone base still remains. From this structure, overlooking a valley on the east side of Ratu Boko compounds, visitors can see Candi Barong, a Hindu temple complex across the valley on the slope of the hill in the east.

=== Ascetic Cave ===
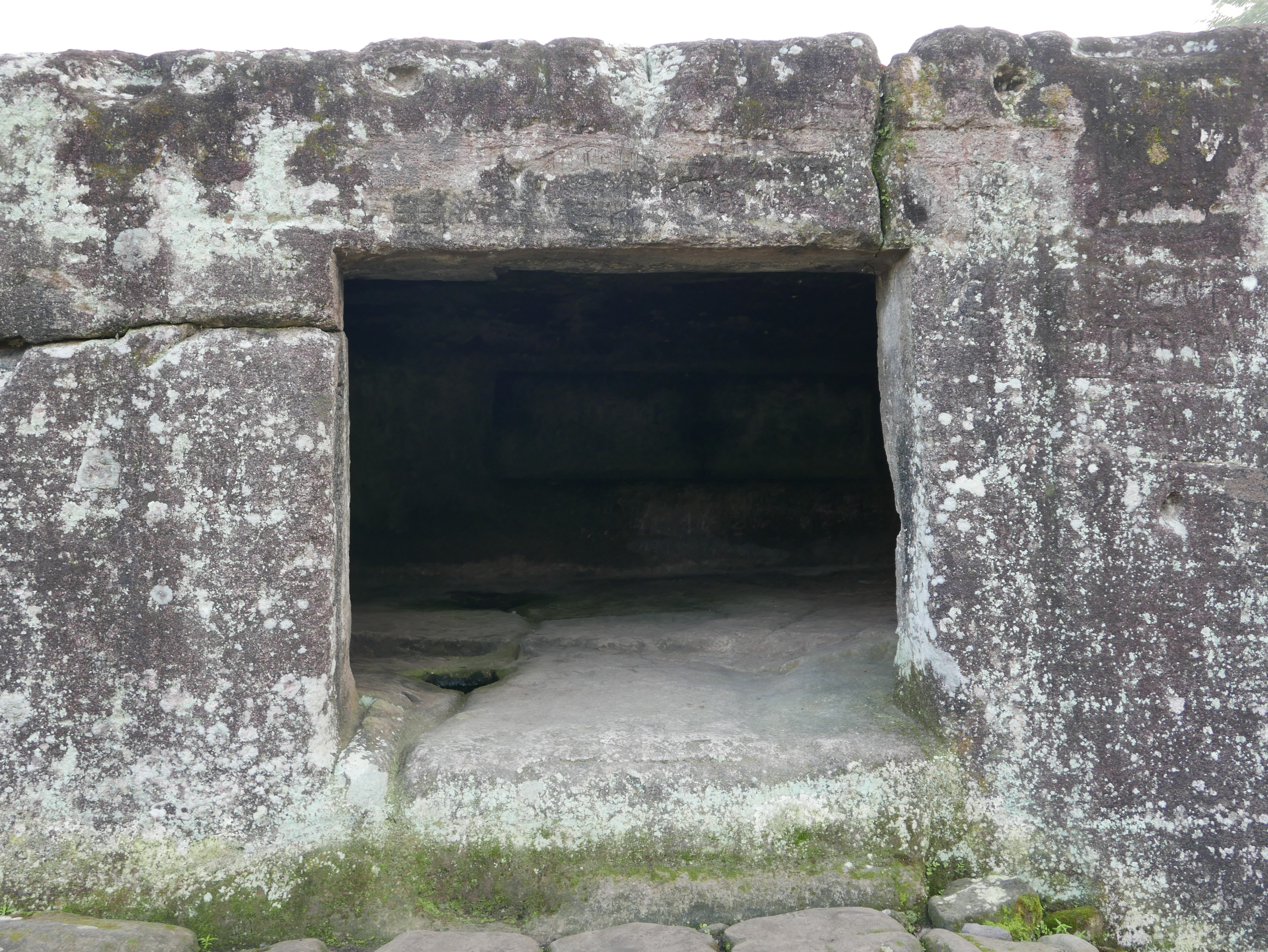
Ascetic cave

At the northern part from pendopo, isolated from the rest of the site, lies two caves that were formed of sediment stones. The upper cave is called Gua Lanang (Male Cave) and the lower cave is called Gua Wadon (Female Cave). In front of Gua Lanang, there is a pond and three effigies. Based on the research, the effigy is known as Aksobya, one of Buddha Pantheons. The cave probably functioned as a meditation place.

== Buddhism and Hinduism ==
Ratu Boko site has yielded many smaller artifacts including statues, both Hindu (Durga, Ganesha, Garuda, a Linga and a Yoni) and Buddhist (three unfinished Dhyani Buddhas). Other finds include ceramics and inscriptions; a golden plate with the writing "Om Rudra ya namah swaha" on it as form of worship to Rudra as another name of Shiva. This proved that the Hindus and Buddhist live together with tolerance or in a syncretism.

== Functions ==
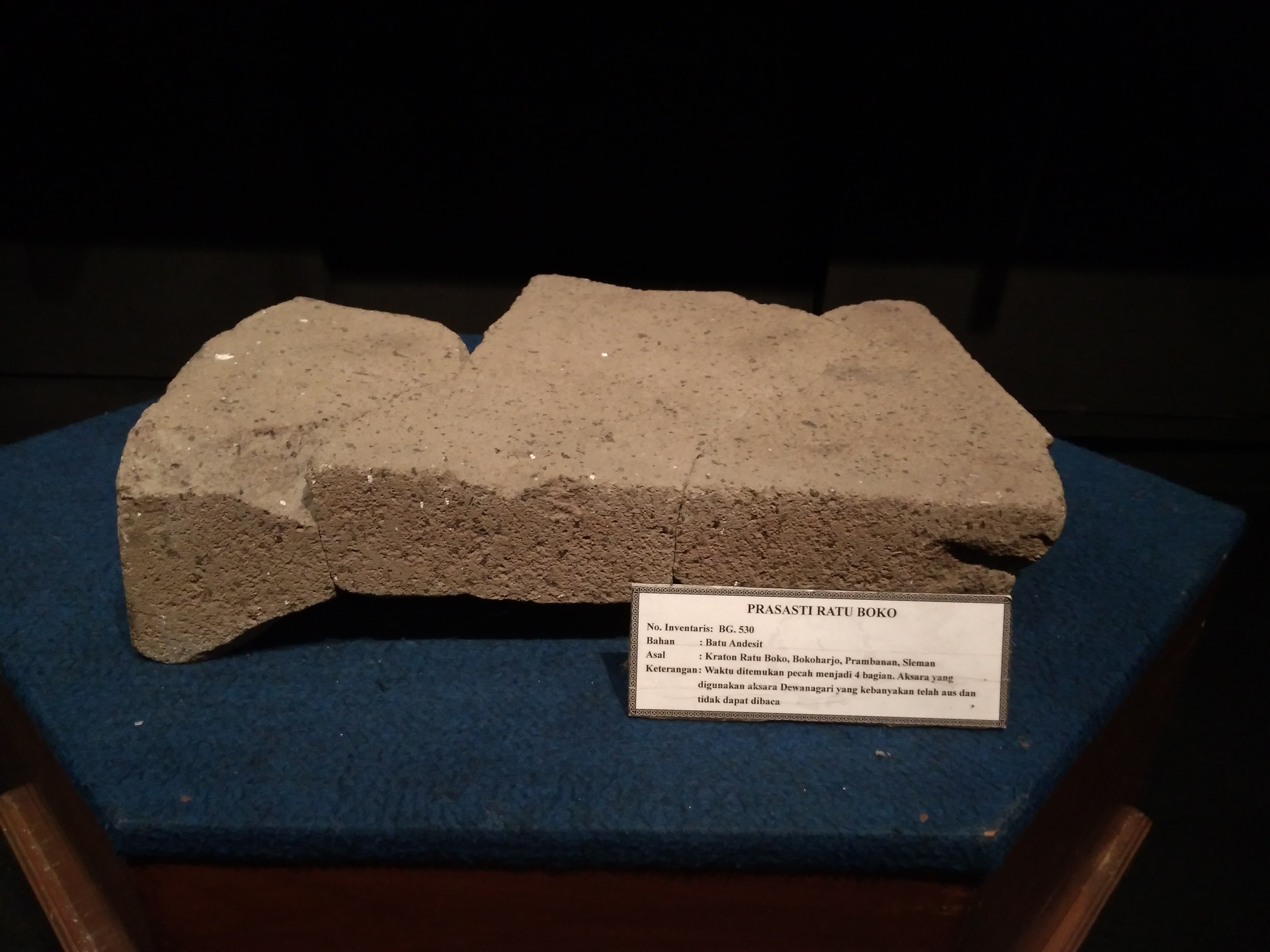
Ratu Boko inscription

Despite the large quantity and variety of remains found there, the exact functions of Ratu Boko site is still unknown. Some believe it was the former palace of ancient Mataram kingdom; other scholars interpret this site as monastery. While third group holds that it was a place for rest and recreation. Inscriptions shows that the site was occupied at least during the 8th and 9th centuries. Five inscriptions in pre-Nagari script and Sanskrit describe the construction of a shrine for Avalokitesvara. One inscriptions refers to the constructions of a Buddhist monastery modelled after Abhayagiri Vihara (means a monastery on a peaceful hill) in Sri Lanka, where a group of ascetic forest dwelling monks resided. Three dated inscriptions in Old Javanese and poetic Sanskrit recount the erection of two lingga, and bear the date of 778 Saka or 856 AD. Another undated inscription mentions the erection of lingga named Hara at the order of King Kalasobhawa.

== The legend of King Boko ==
King Boko is a legendary character known from popular folklore of Loro Jonggrang. This folklore connects the Ratu Boko Palace, the Durga statue in Prambanan temple (which is identified by local folklore as Loro Jonggrang), and the origin of the Sewu temple complex nearby. Prince Bandung Bondowoso loved Princess Loro Jonggrang, the daughter of King Boko, but she rejected his proposal of marriage because Bandung Bondowoso had killed King Boko and ruled her kingdom. Bandung Bondowoso insisted on the union, and finally Loro Jonggrang was forced to agree for a union in marriage, but she posed one condition: Bandung must build her a thousand temples in one night. He entered into meditation and conjured up a multitude of spirits (genies or demons) from the earth. They succeeded in building 999 temples. Loro Jonggrang then woke her palace maids and ordered them to begin pounding rice. This awoke the roosters, which began to crow. The genies, hearing the sound of morning, believed the sun was about to rise and so disappeared back into the ground. Thus the prince was fooled, in revenge he cursed the princess and turned her into a stone statue. According to the traditions, she is the image of Durga in the north cell of the Shiva temple at Prambanan, which is still known as Loro Jonggrang ("Slender Maiden").

== Gallery ==
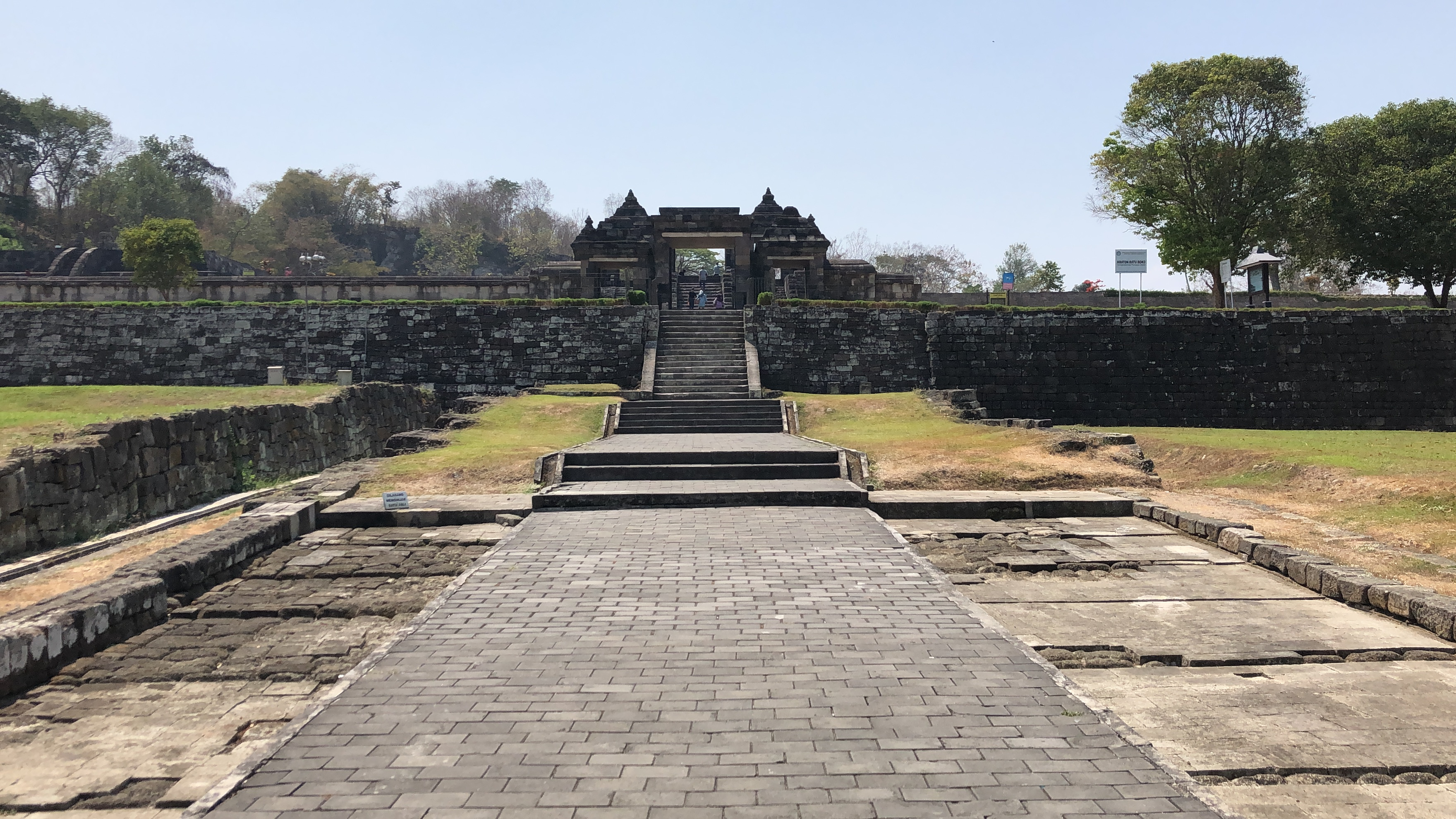
Entrance to the site in late 2019, notice the excavated original path

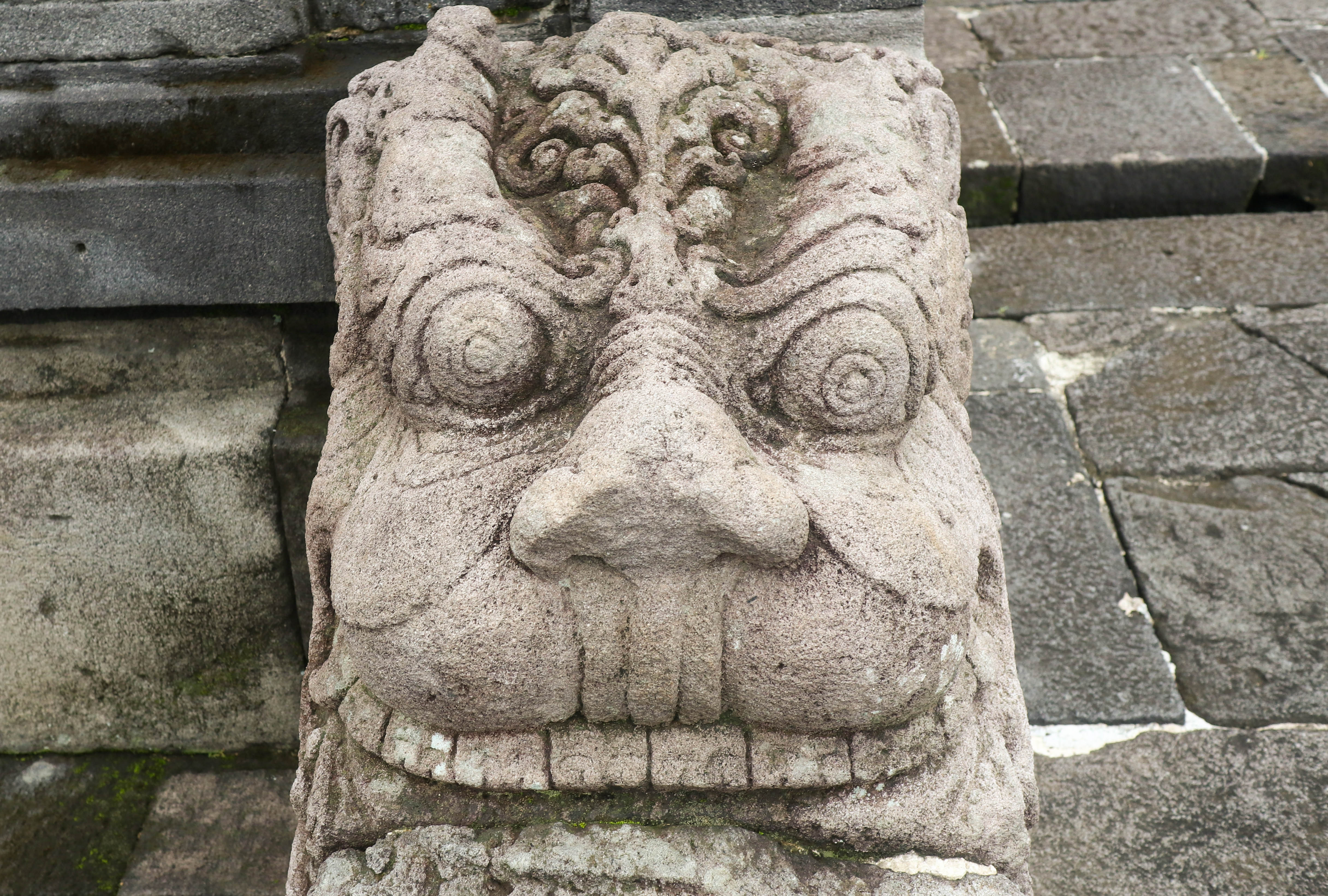
Kala carving on the stair railing

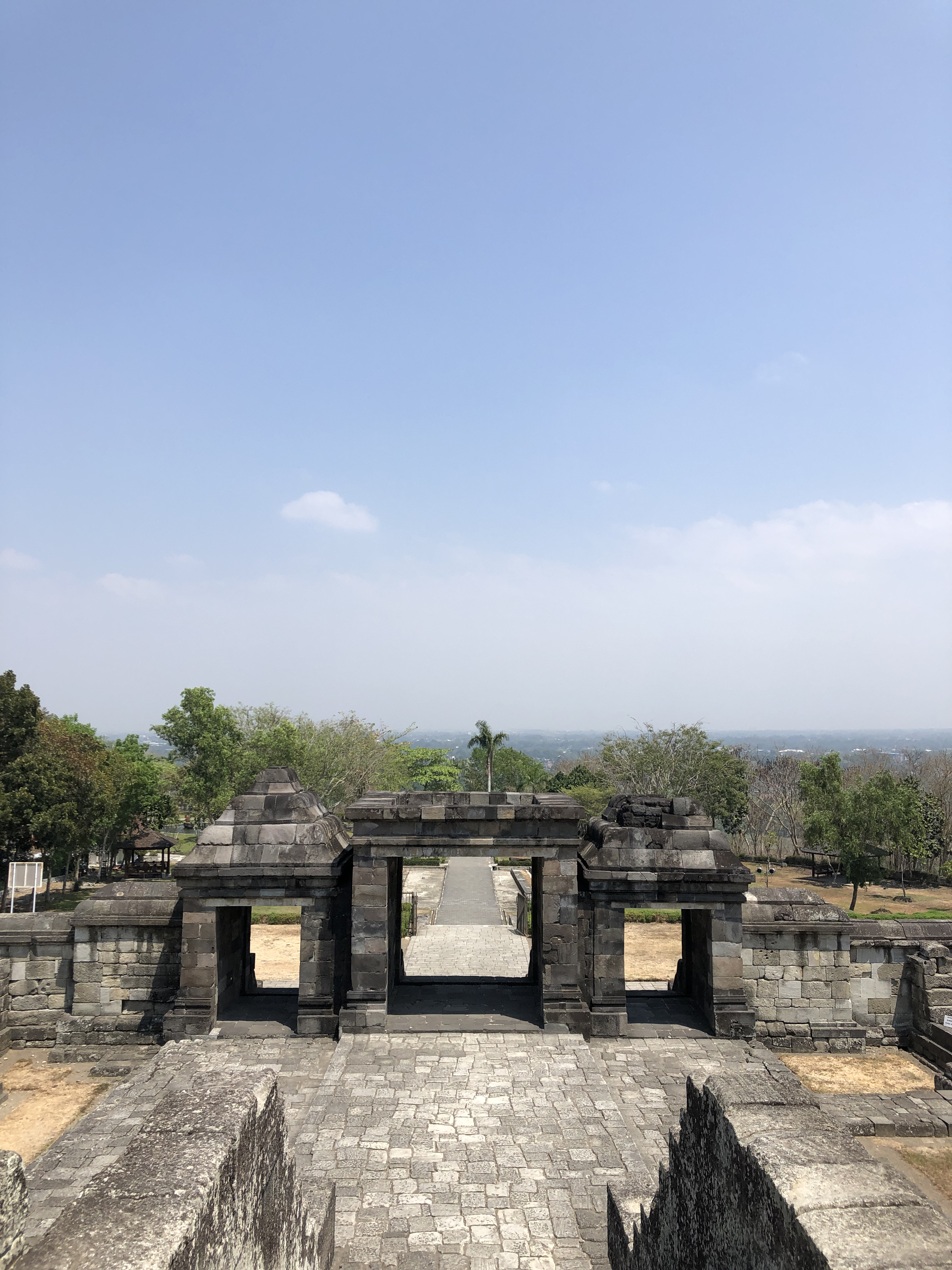
View from the upper gates

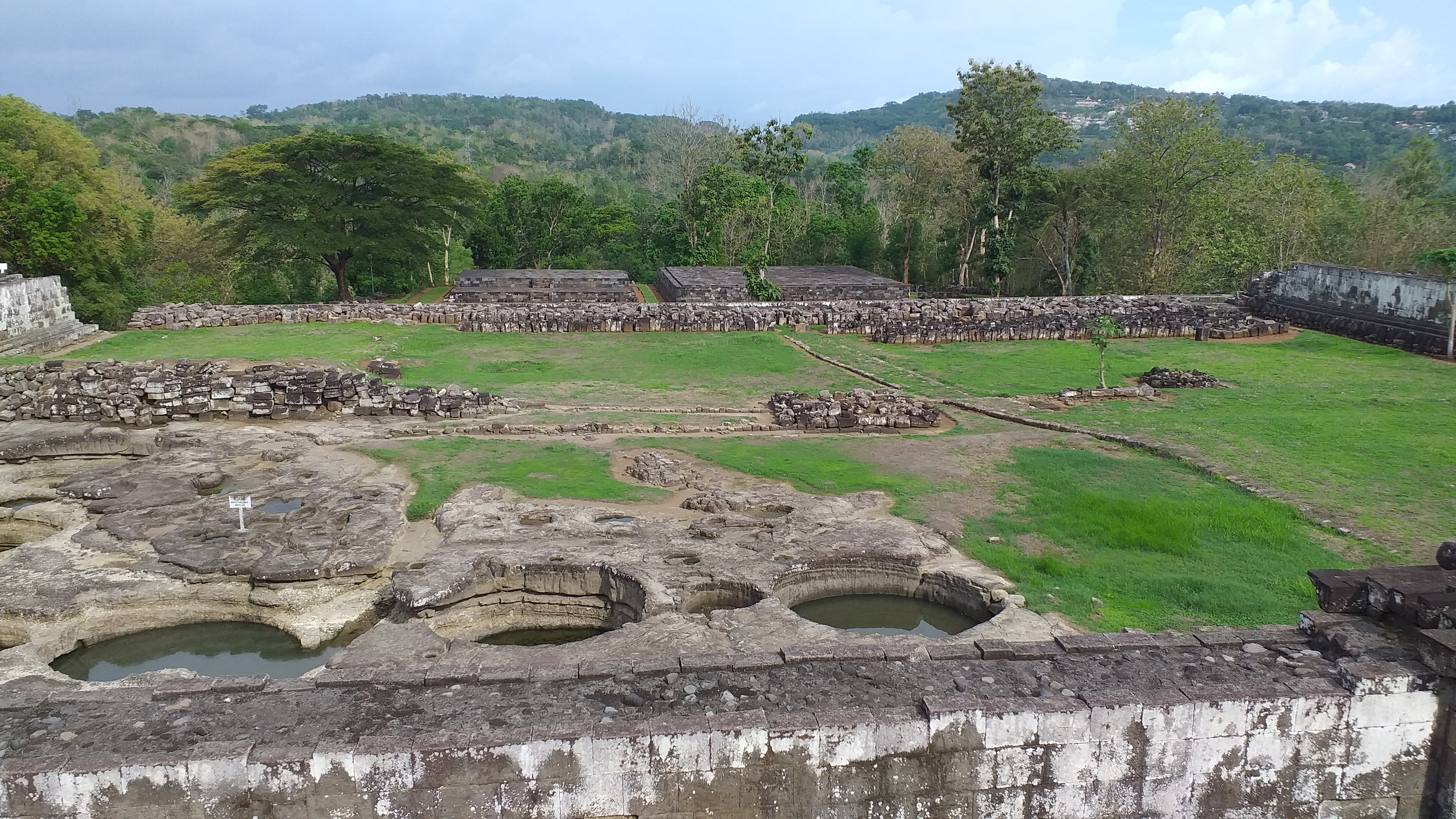
The baths at the back of the complex

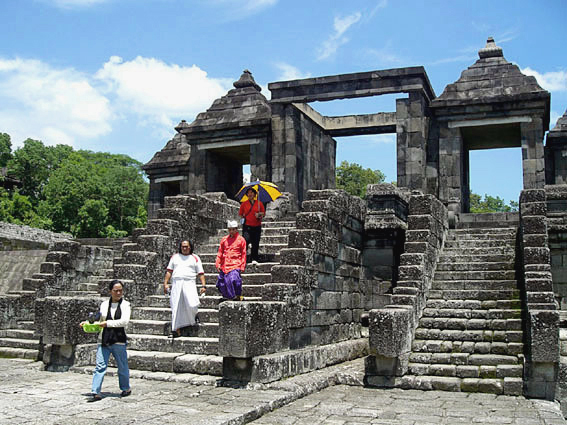
Hindus collecting sacred water from Ratu Boko pool

== See also ==
- Banyunibo
- Borobudur
- Prambanan
- Candi of Indonesia
