= Rakai Pikatan =

- Sang Prabhu Jātiningrat

Great King of Mataram
- Reign: 847 – after 856
- Predecessor: Samaratungga
- Successor: Rakai Kayuwangi Dyah Lokapāla
- Born: Salaḍū
- Spouse: Pramodhawardhani
Regnal name
- Rakai Pikatan Dyah Saladu (Wanua Tengah III inscription) Sang Jātiningrat (Shivagrha inscription)
- House: Sanjaya
- Religion: Hinduism

Salaḍū, Lord of Pikatan (reigned 847–after 856) was a king of the Mataram kingdom in Central Java who built the Prambanan temple, dedicated to Shiva. He is commonly referred to as Rakai Pikatan, which is a title meaning "Lord of Pikatan". His personal name was dyah Salaḍū, where dyah is a personal article indicating noble status.

Salaḍū was a Shivaite Hindu. According to the Wanua Tengah III inscription, Salaḍū was responsible for dissolving a benefice (sīma) that had previously been dedicated to a Buddhist monastery in Pikatan. He is recorded in the Shivagrha inscription as having married a daughter of another religion. This is most likely Pramodhawardhani, the Mahayana Buddhist daughter of Samaratungga, a previous king of Java belonging to the Shailendra dynasty.

The circumstances of Salaḍū's reign are highly conjectural, due to the limited amount of primary source material available. George Coedès hypothesised that Salaḍū fought his brother-in-law Balaputra, forcing him to move to Srivijaya in 856. Other interpretations based on the Kayumwungan inscription put Balaputra as Pramodhawardhani's uncle rather than her brother as inscriptions only list Pramodhawardhani as a child of Samaratungga. In this hypothetical scenario, Balaputra went to Srivijaya not because of force but because he had no claim as a brother of the monarch.

According to the interpretation of Loro Jonggrang legend, Pramodhawardhani's likeness was the model for Durga's image in the Prambanan temple.

Preceded by Samaratungga	Monarch of Mataram Kingdom; 847—855	Succeeded by Dyah Lokapala
