= Kaladi inscription =

10th century Javanese inscriptions

Kaladi inscription is a series of Javanese inscriptions engraved on copper plates dated from the year 831 Saka or 909 CE originated from the Kingdom of Mataram period. It was written in the form of prose in standard Kawi script with some variations, and using the Old Javanese language. This inscription was carved on copperplate (tamra praśasti) totaling 10 plates, however two plates are missing; the plate numbers 3 and 5. Today the 8 plates of Kaladi inscriptions are stored in the National Museum of Indonesia in Jakarta with inventory number E71.

The Kaladi inscription was found in the area of Mount Penanggungan, East Java. The Kaladi inscription dated from early 10th century, during the reign of King Śrī Maharāja Rakai Watukura Dyah Balitung Śrī Dharmmodaya Mahāsambhu of Mataram Kingdom. King Balitung was the successor of Rakai Kayuwangi.

This inscription is important and interesting, because it refers to banditry in ancient Java. The inscription also mentioned about foreign-origin residents that resided in Java. The inscription describes the royal patronage that encourage the development of settlements along the rivers and roads connecting interior settlements with the ports of coastal Java, in order to protect the merchants and coastal settlers by reducing the crime of piracy, robbery and banditry along the trade routes.

== Contents ==
This inscription tells of the establishment of the villages of Kaladi, Gayām, and Pyapya, all included within the samgat (region) of Bawaᶇ. The lands were appointed as Sīma lands by the request of Dapunta Suddhara and Dapunta Dampi to the King Rakai Watukura Balitung. The inscription tells the background of that led to the request; initially there were patches of forests that separates the villages which causes fear among villagers. The village dwellers are constantly under attack from residents (horde of bandits) of Mariwuᶇ, which makes the traders and fishermen feel uneasy and constantly in fear day and night. Then the villagers mutually agreed and decided that the forests should be cleared and transformed into rice paddy fields, so that people will no longer suffer fear, and the rice fields were to be included within the region (samgat) of Bawaᶇ.

This inscription also mentioned the names of the officials in charge of this affairs, and also mention about pegs given to the officials to mark the boundaries of the new Sīma lands' rice fields. The inscription also mentioned sapata law or punishment for violating the Sīma.

In addition, this inscription also explains about foreign-origin people that resided in ancient Java. The inscription mentioned about Kling (refer to Kalinga or simply Southeastern Indian people), Arya (Aryans of the Northern India), Singhala (Sinhalese of Sri Lanka), Drawila (Dravida?, Pondhiceri), Campa (Chams of Champa), Kmir (Khmers of Cambodia, but some translate it as Kashmiri people, although this is highly discounted) and Rman (Mon) as foreigners from mainland Asia that frequently came to Java to trade. The inscription suggests a maritime trade network has been established between kingdoms in mainland Southeast Asia and Java.

== See also ==
- Canggal inscription (732)
- Kalasan inscription (778)
- Kelurak inscription (782)
- Karangtengah inscription (824)
- Tri Tepusan inscription (842)
- Shivagrha inscription (856)
- Mantyasih inscription (907)

== Bibliography ==
- Anjali Nayenggita, 2012, Prasasti Kaladi 831 Śaka, dalam Skripsi di Program Studi Arkeologi, Fakultas Ilmu Pengetahuan Budaya, Universitas Indonesia
