= Shailendra dynasty =

Dynasty in Java from about 750 to 850 CE

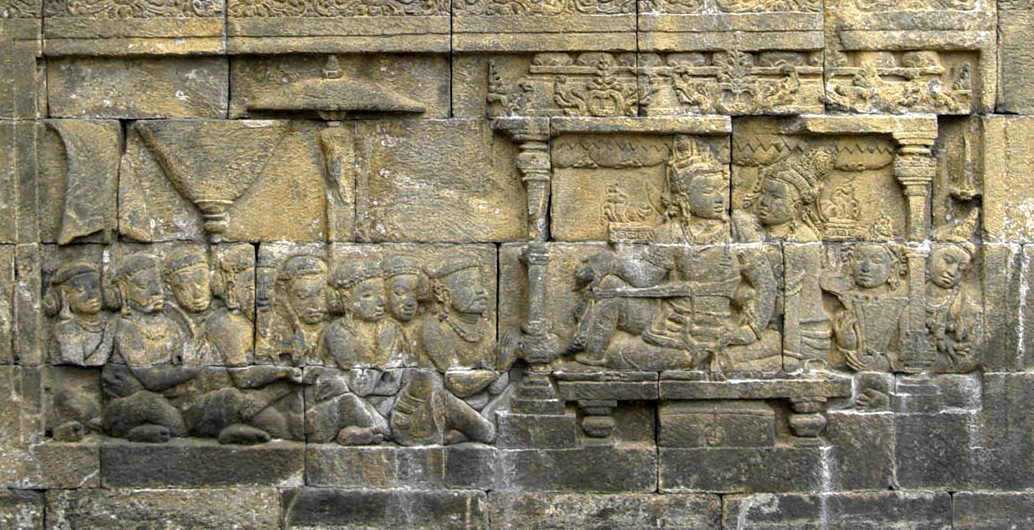
The bas relief of 8th century Borobudur depict a King sitting in Maharajalilasana (king's posture or royal ease) pose, with his Queen and their subjects, the scene is based on Shailendran royal court.

The Shailendra dynasty (IAST: Śailēndra, Indonesian pronunciation: [ʃaɪlenˈdraː] derived from Sanskrit combined words Śaila and Indra, meaning "King of the Mountain", also spelled Sailendra or Syailendra) was the name of a notable Indianised dynasty that emerged in 8th-century Java, whose reign signified a cultural renaissance in the region. The Shailendras were active promoters of Mahayana Buddhism and covered the Kedu Plain of Central Java with Buddhist monuments, one of which is the colossal stupa of Borobudur, now a UNESCO World Heritage Site.

The Shailendras are considered to have been a thalassocracy and ruled vast swathes of maritime Southeast Asia; however, they also relied on agricultural pursuits, by way of intensive rice cultivation on the Kedu Plain of Central Java. The dynasty appeared to be the ruling family of the Mataram kingdom of Central Java, and for some period, the Srivijaya Kingdom in Sumatra.

The inscriptions created by Shailendras use three languages; Old Javanese, Old Malay, and Sanskrit — written either in the Kawi alphabet, or pre-Nāgarī script. The use of Old Malay has sparked speculation of a Sumatran origin, or Srivijayan connection of this family. On the other hand, the use of Old Javanese suggests their firm political establishment on Java. The use of Sanskrit usually indicates the official nature, and/or religious significance, of the event described in any given inscription.

== Primary sources ==
The Sojomerto inscription (9th century CE) discovered in Batang Regency, Central Java, mentioned the name Dapunta Selendra and Selendranamah. The name 'Selendra' has been suggested as another spelling of Shailendra, meaning that Dapunta Selendra was the progenitor of Shailendra family in Central Java. However, recent analysis suggested that this was not true: The inscription has diphthong ai in it, so it is unlikely that Selendra was another name for Shailendra, and the Sumatran origin of Sailendra dynasty was thus unproven.

The earliest dated inscription in Indonesia in which clearly mentioned the dynastic name of Śailēndra as Śailēndravamśatilaka appears is the Kalasan inscription (778) of central Java, which mention its ruler Mahārāja dyāḥ Pañcapaṇa kariyāna Paṇaṃkaraṇa and commemorates the establishment of a Buddhist shrine, Candi Kalasan, dedicated for the goddess Tara.

The name also appears in several other inscriptions like the Kelurak inscription (782) and the Karangtengah inscription (824). Outside Indonesia, the name Shailendra is to be found in the Ligor inscription (775) on the Malay peninsula and Nalanda inscription (860) in India. It is possible that it was Paṇaṃkaraṇa that create the Chaiya, or Ligor inscription (775), and took control over Srivijayan realm in the Southern Thailand Malay Peninsula.

== Possible origins ==
Although the rise of the Shailendras occurred in Kedu Plain in the Javanese heartland, their origin has been the subject of discussion. Apart from Java itself, an earlier homeland in Sumatra, India, or (Cambodia) has been suggested. The latest studies apparently favour a native origin of the dynasty. Despite their connections with Srivijaya in Sumatra and Thai-Malay Peninsula, the Shailendras were more likely of Javanese origin.

=== Java ===
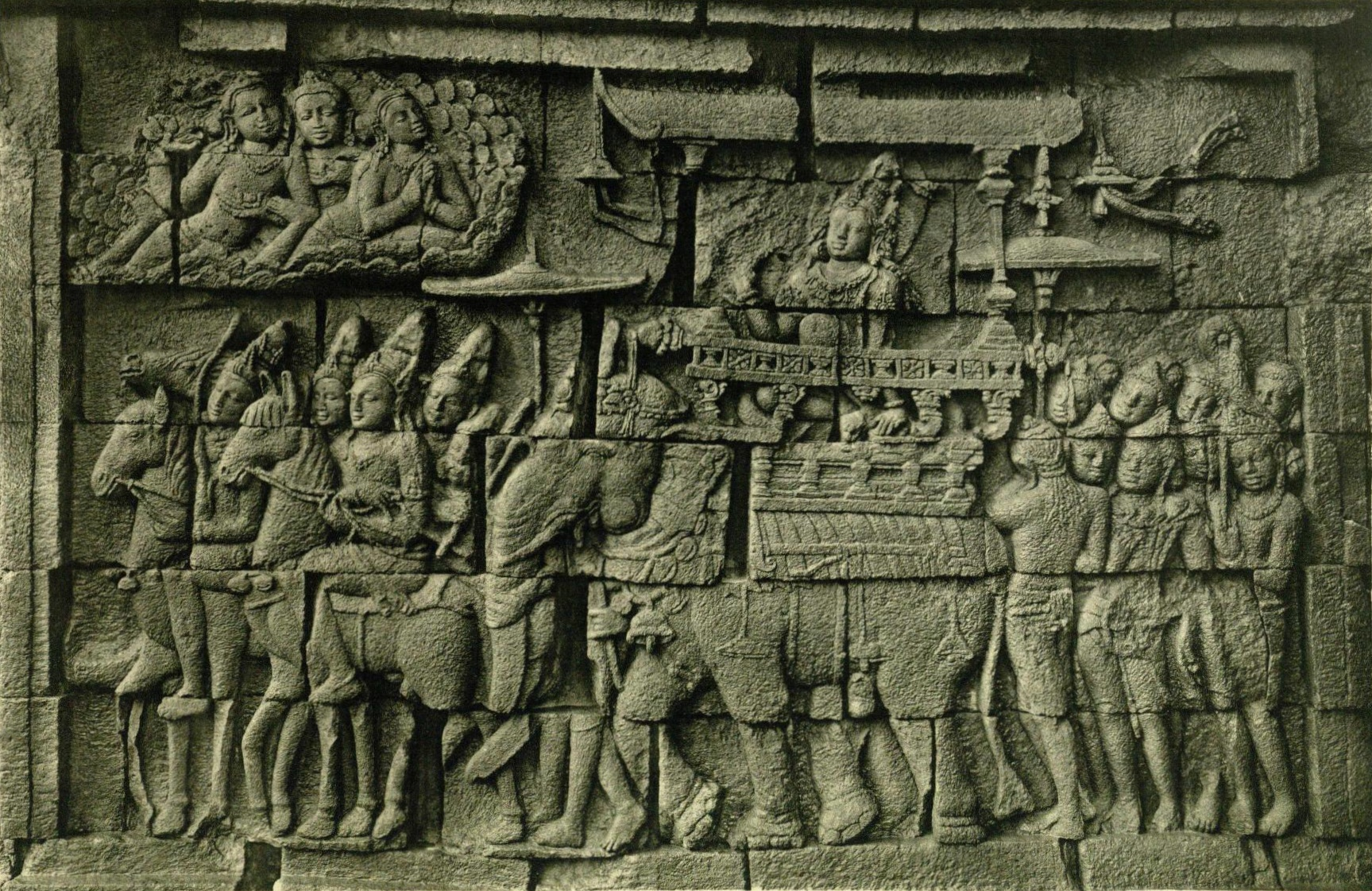
Borobudur relief depicting a royal elephant escorted by soldiers, during Mataram (Medang) era Java.

One theory suggests that Shailendra was a native Javanese dynasty and the Sanjaya dynasty was actually a branch of the Shailendras since Sri Sanjaya and his offspring belong to the Shailendra family that were initially the Shaivist rulers of the Mataram kingdom. The association of Shailendra with Mahayana Buddhism began after the conversion of Panaraban or Panangkaran to Buddhism. This theory is based on the Carita Parahyangan, which tells of the ailing King Sanjaya ordering his son, Rakai Panaraban or Panangkaran, to convert to Buddhism because their faith in Shiva was feared by the people in favor of the pacifist Buddhist faith. The conversion of Panangkaran to Buddhism also corresponds to the Raja Sankhara inscription, which tells of a king named Sankhara (identified as Panangkaran) converting to Buddhism because his Shaiva faith was feared by the people. Unfortunately, the Raja Sankhara inscription is now missing.

=== Sumatra ===
Other scholars hold that the expansion of Buddhist kingdom of Srivijaya was involved in the rise of the dynasty in Java. Supporters of this connection emphasize the shared Mahayana patronage; the intermarriages and the Ligor inscription. Also the fact that some of Shailendra's inscriptions were written in old Malay, which suggested Srivijaya or Sumatran connections. The name 'Selendra' was first mentioned in Sojomerto inscription as "Dapunta Selendra". Dapunta Selendra is suggested as the ancestor of Shailendras. The title Dapunta is similar to those of Srivijayan King Dapunta Hyang Sri Jayanasa, and the inscription — although discovered in Central Java north coast — was written in old Malay, which suggested the Sumatran origin or Srivijayan connection to this family. The Sojomerto inscription is often used as evidence that the Shailendra dynasty came from Sumatra because it assumes the word Selendra as the Malay designation for Shailendra and assumed that Dapunta Selendra was the predecessor of the dynasty. Recent studies show no such evidence: According to Damais, the Sojomerto inscription dates from early 9th century, placing it after the Kedukan Bukit inscription (683 AD). In addition, the name Selendra from the Sojomerto inscription does not seem to have anything to do with Shailendra: The inscription mentions the words hakairu and daiva which have the diphthong ai, so that diphthong should also be used in the name Dapunta Selendra. In addition, this theory is obsolete because there is no data on the existence of the Shailendra dynasty in Sumatra earlier than the ninth century and Srivijaya was unable to conquer Java. What happened was the opposite — the Shailendra dynasty subdued Srivijaya and its area on the Malay peninsula.

=== Odisha (Kalinga) ===
According to the old theory of Ramesh Chandra Majumdar (1933), an Indian scholar, the Shailendra dynasty that established itself in the Indonesian archipelago originated from Kalinga (modern Odisha) in Eastern India. This opinion is also shared by Nilakanta Sastri and J. L. Moens. Moens (1937) further describes that the Shailendras originated in India and established themselves in Palembang before the arrival of Srivijaya's Dapunta Hyang Sri Jayanasa. In 683, the Shailendras moved to Java because of the pressure exerted by Dapunta Hyang and his troops.

=== Discounted proposal ===
In 1934, the French scholar Coedes proposed a relation with the Funan kingdom in Cambodia. Coedes believed that the Funanese rulers used similar-sounding 'mountainlord' titles, but several Cambodia specialists have discounted this. They hold there is no historical evidence for such titles in the Funan period.

== Shailendras in Java ==
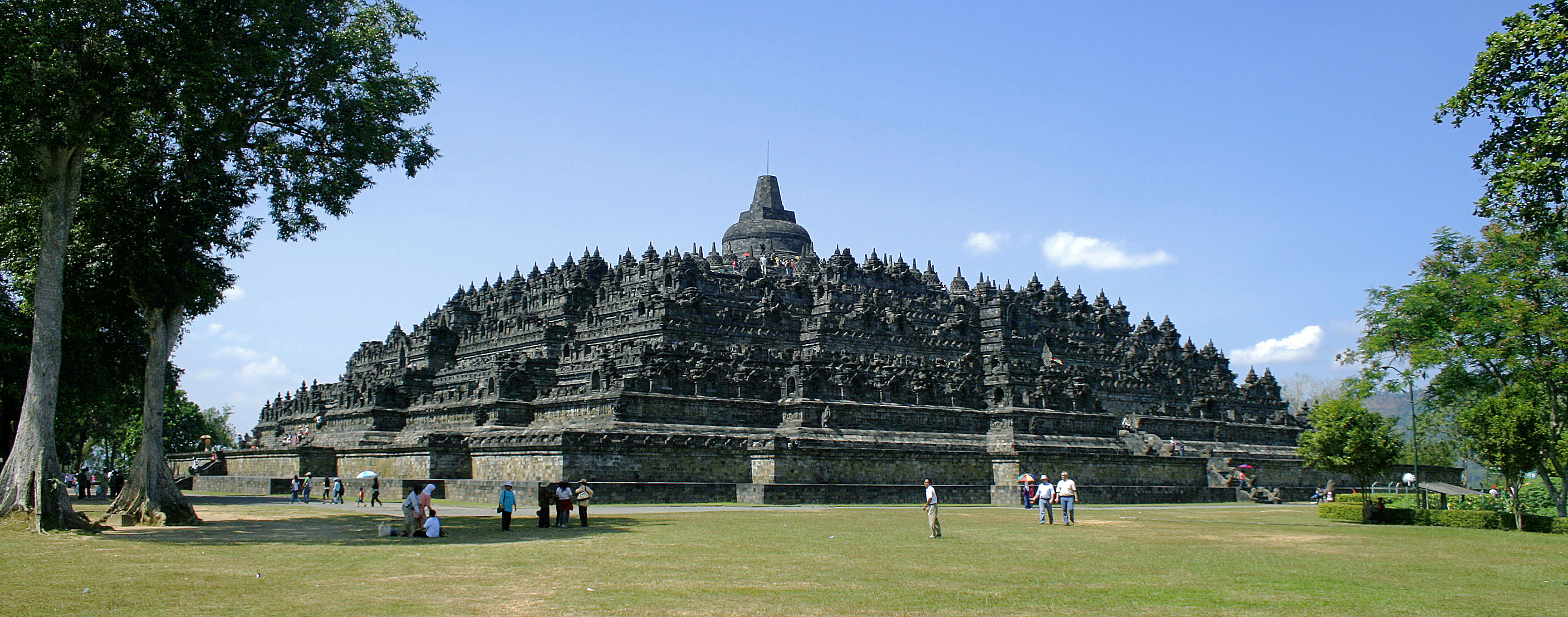
Borobudur, the largest Buddhist structure in the world

The Shailendra rulers maintained cordial relations, including marriage alliances with Srivijaya in Sumatra. For instance, Samaragrawira married Dewi Tara, a daughter of Srivijayan Maharaja Dharmasetu. The mutual alliance between the two kingdoms ensured that Srivijaya had no need to fear the emergence of a Javanese rival and that the Shailendra had access to the international market.

Karangtengah inscription dated 824 mentioned about king Samaratungga. His daughter named Pramodhawardhani has inaugurated a Jinalaya, a sacred buddhist sanctuary. The inscription also mentioned a sacred Buddhist building called Venuvana to place the cremated ashes of King Indra. The Tri Tepusan inscription dated 842 mentioned about the sima (tax free) lands awarded by Śrī Kahulunan (Pramodhawardhani, daughter of Samaratungga) to ensure the funding and maintenance of a Kamūlān called Bhūmisambhāra. Kamūlān itself from the word mula which means 'the place of origin', a sacred building to honor the ancestors. These findings suggested that either the ancestors of the Shailendras were originated from Central Java, or as the sign that Shailendra have established their holds on Java. Casparis suggested that Bhūmi Sambhāra Bhudhāra which in Sanskrit means "The mountain of combined virtues of the ten stages of Boddhisattvahood", was the original name of Borobudur.

The received older version holds that the Shailendra dynasty existed next to the Sanjaya dynasty in Java. Much of the period was characterized by peaceful co-existence and cooperation but towards the middle of the 9th century relations had deteriorated. Around 852 the Sanjaya ruler Pikatan had defeated Balaputra, the offspring of the Shailendra monarch Samaratunga and princess Tara. This ended the Shailendra presence in Java and Balaputra retreated to the Srivijaya kingdom in Sumatra, where he became the paramount ruler.

Earlier historians, such as N.J. Krom and Coedes, tend to equate Samaragrawira and Samaratungga as the same person. However, later historians such as Slamet Muljana equate Samaratungga with Rakai Garung, mentioned in Mantyasih inscription as fifth monarch of Mataram kingdom. Which means Samaratungga was the successor of Samaragrawira, and Balaputradewa that is also Samaragrawira's son, is Samaratungga's younger brother and ruled in Suvarnadvipa (Sumatra), and he is not Samaratungga's son. This version holds Balaputra that reign in Sumatra challenged the Pikatan-Pramodhawardhani legitimation in Java, arguing that his niece and her husband has less rights to rule Java compared to his.

In 851 an Arabic merchant named Sulaiman recorded an event about Javanese Sailendras staging a surprise attack on the Khmers by approaching the capital from the river, after a sea crossing from Java. The young king of Khmer was later punished by the Maharaja, and subsequently the kingdom became a vassal of Sailendra dynasty. In 916 CE, Abu Zaid Hasan mentioned that a polity called Zabag invaded the Khmer kingdom, using 1000 "medium-sized" vessels, which resulted in a Zabag victory. The head of the Khmer king was then brought to Zabag. Regardless of whether the story was true or not or just a legend, it may have a connection with the independence of Cambodia from Javanese suzerainty in 802 CE. Zabag might corresponds to Jawaka/Javaka, which may refer to Java or South Sumatra.

== Shailendras in Sumatra ==
After 824, there are no more references to the Shailendra house in the Javanese epigraphic record. Around 860 the name re-appears in the Nalanda inscription in India. According to the text, the king Devapaladeva of Bengala (Pala Empire) had granted 'Balaputra, the king of Suvarna-dvipa' (Sumatra) the revenues of 5 villages to a Buddhist monastery near Bodh Gaya. Balaputra was styled a descendant from the Shailendra dynasty and grandson of the king of Java.

From Sumatra, the Shailendras also maintained overseas relations with the Chola kingdom in Southern India, as shown by several south Indian inscriptions. An 11th-century inscription mentioned the grant of revenues to a local Buddhist sanctuary, built in 1005 by the king of the Srivijaya. In spite the relations were initially fairly cordial, hostilities had broken out in 1025. Rajendra Chola I the Emperor of the Chola dynasty conquered some territories of the Shailendra dynasty in the 11th century. The devastation caused by Chola invasion of Srivijaya in 1025, marked the end of Shailendra family as the ruling dynasty in Sumatra. The last king of Shailendra dynasty — the Maharaja Sangrama Vijayatunggavarman — was imprisoned and taken as hostage. Nevertheless, amity was re-established between the two states, before the end of the 11th century. In 1090 a new charter was granted to the old Buddhist sanctuary, it is the last known inscription with a reference to the Shailendras. With the absence of legitimate successor, Shailendra dynasty seems ceased to rule. Other family within Srivijaya mandala took over the throne, a new Maharaja named Sri Deva according to Chinese source establishing new dynasty to rule Srivijaya. He sent an embassy to the court of China in 1028 CE.

== Shailendras in Bali ==
One source speculates that Sri Kesari Warmadewa was a Buddhist king of the Shailendra dynasty who led a military expedition to establish a Mahayana Buddhist government in Bali. The Belanjong pillar in Sanur in Bali of 914, is the main record of this king, but does not provide any evidence that the Warmadewa dynasty of Bali was connected to the Shailendras.

== List of Shailendran rulers ==
Traditionally, the Shailendra period was viewed to span from the 8th to the 9th century, confined only in Central Java, from the era of Panangkaran to Samaratungga. However the recent interpretation suggests the longer period of Shailendra family might existed, from the early 9th century (edict of Sojomerto inscription) to early 11th century (the fall of Shailendran dynasty of Srivijaya under Chola invasion). For certain period, Shailendras ruled both Central Java and Sumatra. Their alliance and intermarriage with Srivijayan ruling family resulted with the merging of two royal houses, with Shailendran finally emerge as the ruling family of both Srivijaya and Mataram (Central Java).

Some historians tried to reconstruct the order and list of Shailendra rulers, although there is some disagreement on the list. Boechari tried to reconstruct the early stage of Shailendra based on Sojomerto inscription, while other historians such as Slamet Muljana and Poerbatjaraka tried to reconstruct the list of Shailendran king in middle and later period with their connections to Sanjaya and Srivijaya, based on inscriptions and Carita Parahyangan manuscript. However, there is some confusion occurred, because the Shailendra seems to rule many kingdoms; Kalingga, Mataram and later Srivijaya. As the result name of the same kings often overlapped and seem to rule these kingdoms simultaneously. The questionmark (?) signify doubt or speculation because of the scarcity of available valid sources.

Date	King's or ruler's name	Capital	Stone inscription and source of historical account	Event
674—703	Shima (?)	Kalingga, somewhere between Pekalongan and Jepara	Carita Parahyangan, Chinese account on Hwi-ning visits to Ho-ling kingdom (664) and the reign of queen Hsi-mo (674)	Ruling the kingdom of Kalingga
703—710	Mandiminyak (?)	?	Carita Parahyangan	Son-in-law of Shima, ruling the kingdom of Galuh
710—717	Sanna	?	Canggal inscription (732), Carita Parahyangan	Sanna ruled Java, but after his death the kingdom fell to chaotic disunity by usurper or foreign invasion
717—760	Sanjaya	Mataram, Central Java	Canggal inscription (732), Carita Parahyangan	Sanjaya, the nephew (or son?) of Sanna restore the order and ascend to throne, some early historian took this event as the establishment of new Sanjaya dynasty, while other hold that this only the continuation of Shailendras
760—775	Rakai Panangkaran	Mataram, Central Java	Raja Sankhara inscription, Kalasan inscription (778), Carita Parahyangan	Rakai Panangkaran converted from Shaivism to Mahayana Buddhism, construction of Kalasan temple
775—800	Dharanindra	Mataram, Central Java	Kelurak inscription (782), Ligor inscription (c. 782 or 787)	Also ruled Srivijaya in Sumatra, construction of Manjusrigrha temple, started the construction of Borobudur (c. 770), Java ruled Ligor and Southern Cambodia (Chenla) (c. 790)
800—812	Samaragrawira	Mataram, Central Java	Ligor inscription (c. 787)	Also ruled Srivijaya, lost Cambodia (802)
812—833	Samaratungga	Mataram, Central Java	Karangtengah inscription (824)	Also ruled Srivijaya, completion of Borobudur (825)
833—856	Pramodhawardhani co-reign with her husband Rakai Pikatan	Mataram, Central Java	Shivagrha inscription (856)	Defeated and expelled Balaputra to Srivijaya (Sumatra). Construction of Prambanan and Plaosan temple. The successors of Pikatan, the series of Mataram kings from Lokapala (850—890) to Wawa (924—929) could be considered as the continuation of Shailendra lineage, although King Balitung (898—910) in Mantyasih inscription (907) sought ancestor only as far as Sanjaya, thus enforced the Sanjaya dynasty theory.
833—850	Balaputradewa	Srivijaya, South Sumatra	Shivagrha inscription (856), Nalanda inscription (860)	Defeated by Pikatan-Pramodhawardhani, expelled from Central Java, took refuge in Sumatra and rule Srivijaya, claim as the legitimate successor of Shailendra dynasty from Java
c. 960	Śri Udayadityavarman	Srivijaya, South Sumatra	Embassies to China (960 and 962)	Sending embassies, tribute and trade mission to China
c. 980	Haji (Hia-Tche)	Srivijaya, South Sumatra	Embassies to China (980–983)	Sending embassies, tribute and trade mission to China
c. 988	Sri Cudamani Warmadewa	Srivijaya, South Sumatra	Embassies to China (988-992-1003), Tanjore Inscription or Leiden Inscription (1044)	Sending embassies, tribute and trade mission to China, Javanese King Dharmawangsa invasion on Srivijaya, building of temple for Chinese Emperor, gift of village by Raja-raja I
c. 1008	Sri Maravijayottungga	Srivijaya, South Sumatra	Embassies to China (1008)	Sending embassies, tribute and trade mission to China (1008)
c. 1017	Sumatrabhumi	Srivijaya, South Sumatra	Embassies to China (1017)	Sending embassies, tribute and trade mission to China (1017)
c. 1025	Sangrama Vijayatunggavarman	Srivijaya, South Sumatra	Chola Inscription on the temple of Rajaraja, Tanjore	Chola raid on Srivijaya, the capital captured by Rajendra Chola

== See also ==
- List of monarchs of Java
- Slendro
- Candi of Indonesia
- Indonesian Esoteric Buddhism
