= Mantyasih inscription =

Inscription from Central Java, Indonesia

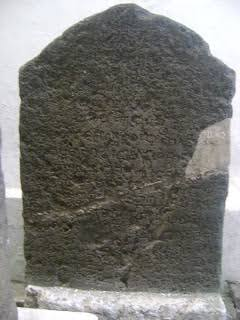
Mantyasih inscription

The Mantyasih inscription (also known as Balitung charter and Kedu inscription) is an important inscription found and kept by Li Djok Ban in Ngadireja Parakan Temanggung, then the inscription was brought by one of the princes of Surakarta to brought to Surakarta and is now stored in the Radyapustaka Museum, Central Java, Indonesia. It is dated to 907 and was created by King Balitung from the Sanjaya dynasty, of the Ancient Mataram kingdom. This inscription contains a genealogy of the kings of Mataram before King Balitung.

The inscription mentions that Mantyasih village was awarded by King Balitung as sima (tax-free) land. In Mateseh village today a stone mortar believed to be used during sima ceremony can still be found. Two mountains are also mentioned: Mount Susundara and Wukir Sumbing (today Mount Sundoro and Sumbing).

== Contents ==
The inscription was dated 828 Saka (907 CE). This is the part that contains the genealogy list of Mataram ruling kings, part B lines 7-9:

- ta < 7 > sak rahyang ta rumuhun. sirangbăsa ing wanua. sang mangdyan kahyaňan. sang magawai kadatwan. sang magalagah pomahan. sang tomanggöng susuk. sang tumkeng wanua gana kandi landap nyan paka çapatha kamu. rahyang
- < 8 > ta rumuhun. ri mdang. ri poh pitu. rakai mataram. sang ratu sańjaya. çri mahǎrǎja rakai panangkaran. çri mahǎrǎja rakai panunggalan. çri mahǎrǎja rakai warak. çri mahǎrǎja rakai garung. çri mahǎrǎja rakai pikatan
- < 9 > çri mahǎrǎja rakai kayuwańi. çri mahǎrǎja rakai watuhumalang. lwiha sangkā rikā landap nyān paka çapatha çri mahǎrǎja rakai watukura dyah dharmmodaya mahāçambhu.

== Interpretations ==
Bosch, in his book Sriwijaya, de Sailendrawamsa en de Sanjayawamsa (1952), suggests that in the Mataram kingdom, there were two dynasties, the Sanjaya dynasty, and the Sailendra dynasty that equally ruled the kingdom. The Sanjaya lineage was established by Sri Sanjaya, the founder of the Mataram Kingdom, who adhered to Shivaist Hinduism. The next Maharaja was Panangkaran, who, according to Bosch, was defeated by the Sailendras. Thus in Mataram. there were two dynasties: the Sanjayas ruled the northern parts of Java, while the Sailendras ruled in southern Java. The daughter of Sailendra Maharaja Samaratungga, named Pramodhawardhani, married Rakai Pikatan of Sanjaya, who succeeded his father-in-law's throne. As a result, the Sanjaya returned to power in Mataram. Bosch assumed that the title rakai was a dynastic title. The list of Sanjaya kings recorded in the Mantyasih inscription according to Bosch:

- Rakai Mataram Sang Ratu Sanjaya
- Sri Maharaja Rakai Panangkaran
- Sri Maharaja Rakai Panunggalan
- Sri Maharaja Rakai Warak
- Sri Maharaja Rakai Garung
- Sri Maharaja Rakai Pikatan
- Sri Maharaja Rakai Kayuwangi
- Sri Maharaja Rakai Watuhumalang
- Sri Maharaja Rakai Watukura Dyah Dharmmodaya Mahasambhu.

== See also ==
- Canggal inscription (732)
- Kalasan inscription (778)
- Kelurak inscription (782)
- Karangtengah inscription (824)
- Laguna Copperplate Inscription (900)
- Tri Tepusan inscription (842)
- Shivagrha inscription (856)
- Candi of Indonesia
- Hinduism in Indonesia
- Hinduism in Java
- Indonesian Esoteric Buddhism
