= Sojomerto inscription =

Inscription from Central Java, Indonesia

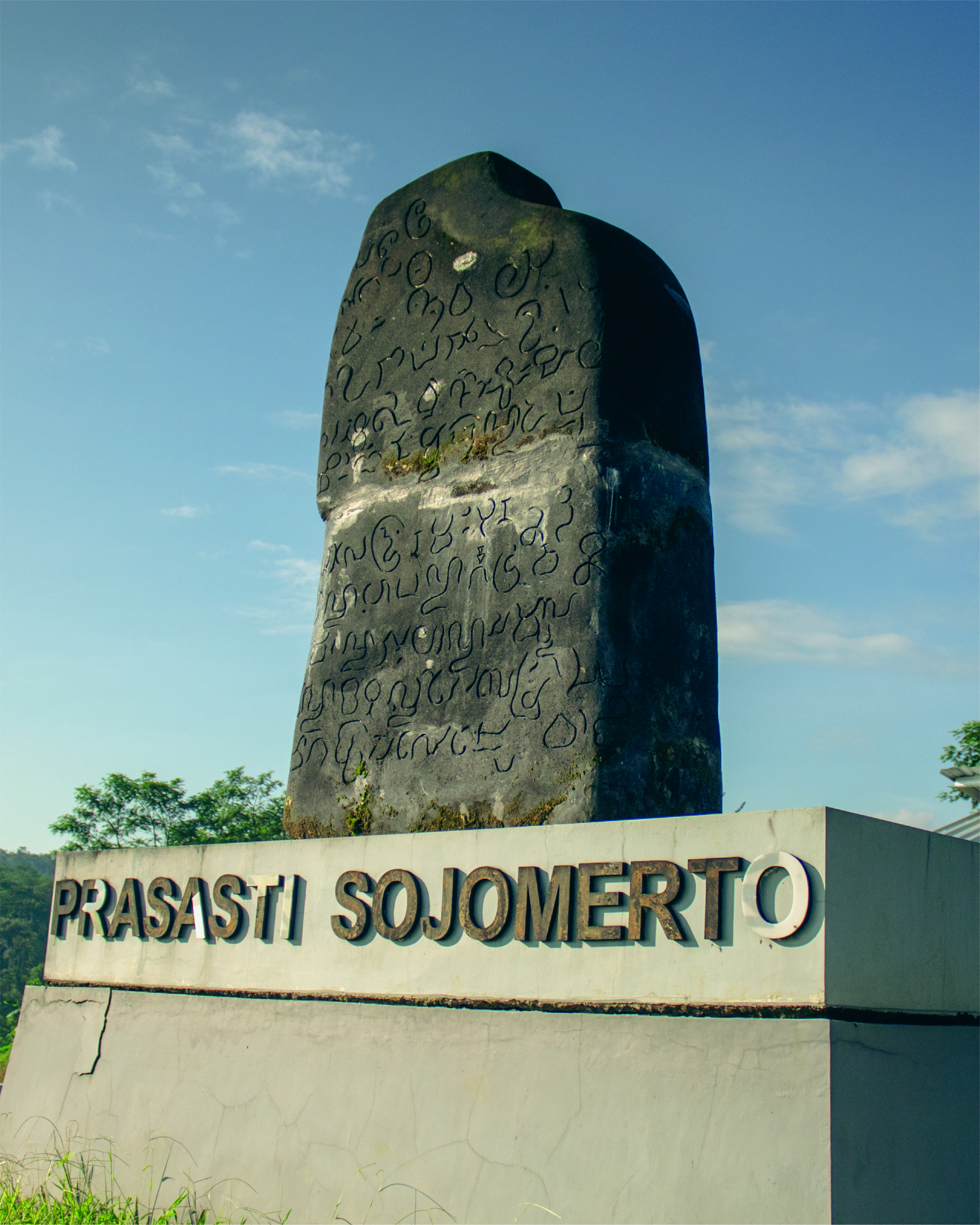
- Material: Andesite stone
- Size: 43 cm × 78 cm × 7 cm (16.9 in × 30.7 in × 2.8 in)
- Writing: Brahmic (possibly Old Javanese)
- Created: 9th century
- Discovered: Sojomerto village, Reban, Batang Regency, Central Java (Indonesia)
- Present location: Central Java
- Language: Sanskrit

Sojomerto inscription (Javanese: prasasti Sojahmarta; ꦱꦺꦴꦗꦃꦩꦂꦠ; Sanskrit: praśasti Sajāmarta; सजमर्त) is an inscription discovered at the Sojomerto village of Reban in the Batang Regency of Central Java, Indonesia. Written in Old Malay using the Brahmic writing system (most probably Old Javanese), it is dated to the early 9th century using palaeographic method. The inscription is currently in situ or on location, and Shivaist in nature.

The inscription was carved on an andesite stone 43 cm wide, 7 cm thick, and 78 cm tall. The text consists of 11 lines, most of them being unclear and eroded.

== Content ==
=== Transliteration ===
Line	Transliteration (IAST)	Devanagari equivalent	Translation
1	… aryayon śrī sāta …	… आर्य श्री शत …	… Aryan [High(?)] hundred honor, (equivalent to Royal Highness)
2	… _ ā kotī	… अकोटि / कोटि	… the supreme one,
3	oṃ namaḥ Śivāya	ॐ नमः शिवाय	O salutations to the auspicious one (esp. Shiva)!
4	bhatāra parameśva-	अवतार परमेश्व-	avatar (incarnation) of the Highest Lo-
5	-ra śarva daiva ku sāṁva hiya	-र सर्व दैव कु शंव हेय	-rd, the All divine courageous fortune
6	– mih inan –is-ānda dapū-	मिह् इनाम महिना वन्द रजपू-	[who] sprinkle strength/power/dominion to the Rājpū-
7	-nta Śailaindra namah Shāntanu	-त शैलेन्द्र नमः शान्तनु	-tra (ruler) of Shailendra dynasty, obeisance of Shāntanu
8	namānda bāpanda bhadravati	नमत बाप भद्रवती	[which] saluted [the] father Bhadravati,
9	namanda ayanda sampūla	नमत आर्यअण्ड सांवला	saluted [the] grandparent Sampula
10	namanda vanita Śailaindra namah	नमत वनिता शैलेन्द्र नमः	saluted [the] woman/lady of Shailendra, obeisance
11	Amoghapāśa lempevāṃih	अमोघपाश लम्भवामि	so that it may never [experience] Amoghapāśa (strangled in bankruptcy/failure), and [may it] longlast

== Interpretation ==
The inscription is largely in Sanskrit (with some mantras), and it's a dedication text likely glorifying a royal figure associated with the Śailendra dynasty. Here's a line-by-line interpretation:

1. … aryayon śrī sāta …
  "... noble one, Śrī Sāta ..."
  → Possibly referring to a respected or exalted figure (perhaps the main subject of the inscription) using honorific titles.
2. … _ ā kotī
  "... the supreme one,"
  → Indicates exaltation—possibly a divine or royal title like "parama kotī" (the highest tier).
3. oṃ namaḥ Śivāya
  "Salutations to Lord Śiva."
  → A classic invocation used in Shaivism, showing religious devotion.
4. bhatāra parameśva-
  "[To] the revered one, the Supreme Lord..."
  → Suggesting Śiva as Parameśvara, or could be a deified ruler.
5. -ra śarva daiva ku sāṁva hiya
  "...Lord Śarva (another name of Śiva), all-divine, brave and fortunate..."
  → Continues the invocation, highlighting divine qualities and possibly linking them to a royal figure.
6. –mih inan –is-ānda dapū-
  "...who bestows strength/power/dominion to the..."
  → A divine figure (likely Śiva) empowering the ruling class.
7. -nta Śailaindra namah Shāntanu
  "... Śailendra (dynasty), obeisance of Shāntanu."
  → A link between Shāntanu (a person or ancestor) and the Śailendra lineage, possibly invoking reverence or continuity.
8. namānda bāpanda bhadravati
  "[It] salutes the father, Bhadravati,"
  → Showing respect to a paternal figure—likely a noble or revered ancestor.
9. namanda ayanda sampūla
  "Salutes the ancestor/grandfather Sampūla"
  → Emphasizing lineage and ancestral reverence.
10. namanda vanita Śailaindra namah
  "Salutes the lady/woman of the Śailendra [dynasty], obeisance"
  → Acknowledging a royal woman—could be a queen or matriarchal figure.
11. Amoghapāśa lempevāṃih
  "May it avoid the snare of failure (Amoghapāśa), may it last long."
  → A wish or blessing for enduring success and prosperity, avoiding downfall.

Overall, the Sojomerto inscription is a devotional and royal eulogy that:

- Opens with an invocation to Śiva, praising Him as Parameśvara and Śarva.
- Ties divine blessing to the Śailendra dynasty, suggesting divine legitimacy or favor.
- Shows reverence to several ancestors (Bhadravati, Sampūla) and a noblewoman, indicating a strong emphasis on lineage.
- Ends with a prayer for continued fortune, invoking Amoghapāśa (symbolizing escape from failure).

This inscription thus serves both a religious and political function: sanctifying the royal house and affirming its divine support and enduring legacy.

== See also ==
- Canggal inscription (732)
- Kalasan inscription (778)
- Kelurak inscription (782)
- Manjusrigrha inscription (792)
- Karangtengah inscription (824)
- Tri Tepusan inscription (842)
