= Supreme Court Museum =

Museum dedicated to the journey of judiciary in India

Supreme Court Museum is the museum dedicated to the journey of judiciary in India along with the federal court and supreme court. The museum houses objects like the Harappan seals, Ashokan Edit, Nalanda Copper Plate and also items on Indian legal system during British Raj. Many souvenirs and files that are associated with landmark judgement are also a part of the museum. The idea of the museum was of former Chief Justice of India, M N Venkatachaliah (1994). However, the idea could only be materialised after 10 years. The museum reported having around 1,500 items in 2020.

The museum can be reached via Delhi Metro by exiting from Pragati Maidan metro Gate Number 1.

Some notable records include:

- Mahatma Gandhi murder case
- Indira Gandhi assassination case
- Shah Bano Case
