= Nalanda inscription of Devapaladeva =

The Nalanda Copper-plate of Devapaladeva is an ancient Buddhist inscription located in Nalanda, within the present day Bihar state of Northeastern India. It has been dated to 860 CE.

The inscription talks about king Devapaladeva of Bengala (Pala Empire) who had granted the request of Sri Maharaja of Suvarnadvipa, Balaputra, to build a Buddhist monastery at Nalanda. Balaputra was mentioned as the son of Samaragrawira, grandson of Śailendravamsatilaka (the jewel of the Śailendra family) with stylized name Śrīviravairimathana (the slayer of enemy hero), king of Java that married Tārā, daughter of Dharmasetu.

It was found by Hirananda Shastri in 1921 in the antechamber of Monastery 1 at Nalanda.

== Inscription's text ==
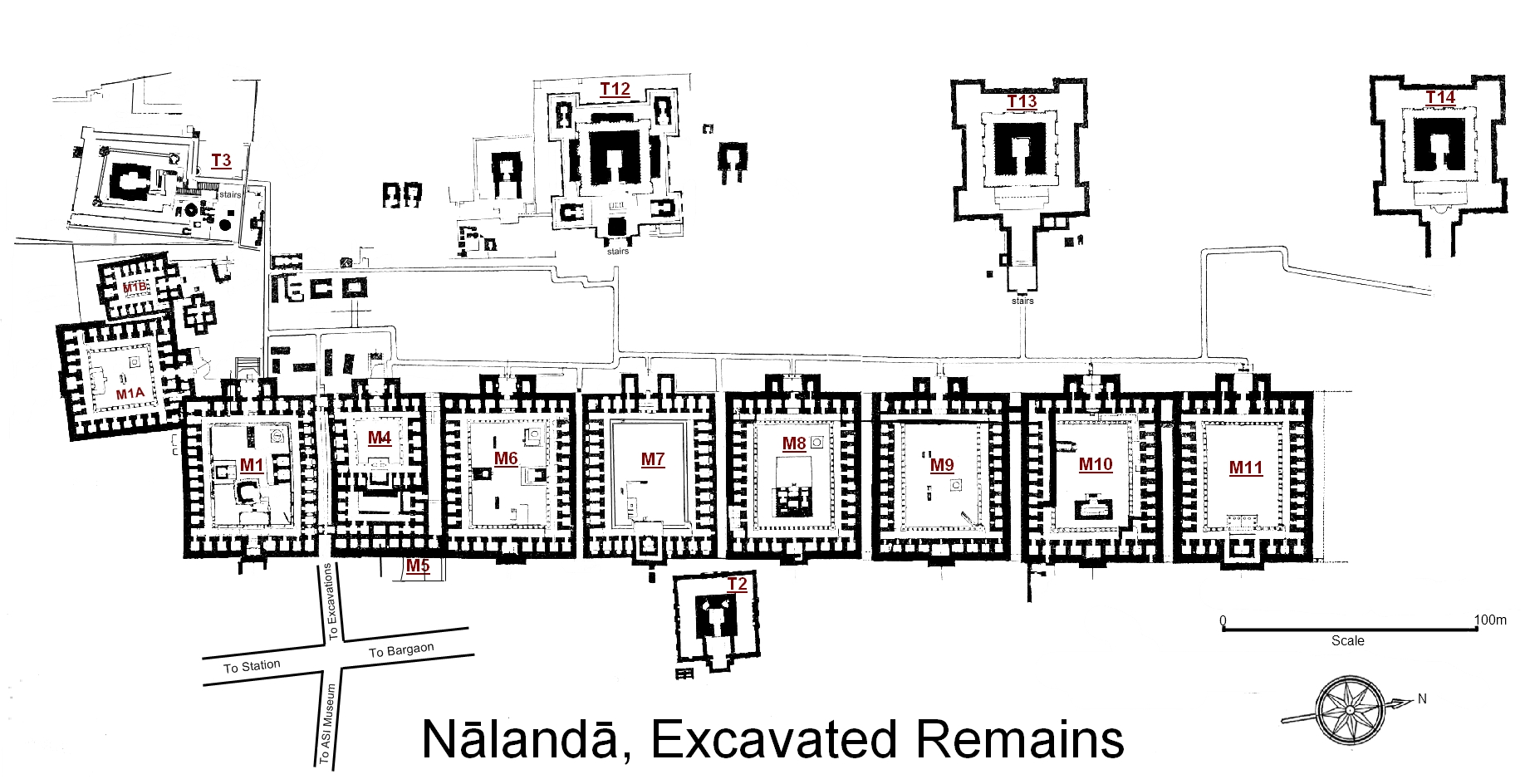
A map of the excavated remains of Nalanda.

"We being requested by the illustrious Maharaja Balaputradeva, the king of Suwarnadvipa through a messenger I have caused to be built a monastery at Nalanda granted by this edict toward the income for the blessed Lord Buddha, the abode of all the leading virtues like the prajnaparamita, for the offerings, oblations, shelter, garments, alms, beds, the requisites of the sick like medicines, etc. of the assembly of the venerable bhiksus of the four quarters (comprising) the Boddhisattvas well versed in the tantras, and the eight great holy personages (i.e. the aryapuggalas) for writing the dharma-ratnas of Buddhist texts and for the up-keep ad repair of the monastery (when) damaged.

There was a king of Yavabhumi (Yava or Java), who was the ornament of the Sailendra dynasty, whose lotus feet bloomed by lustre of the jewels in the row of trembling diadems on the heads of all the princes, and whose name was conformable to the illustrious tormentor of brave foes (vira-vairi-mathana). His fame, incarnate as it were by setting its foot on the regions of (white) palaces, in white water lilies, in lotus plants, conches, moon, jasmine and snow and being incessantly sung in all the quarters, pervaded the whole universe. At the time when the king frowned in anger, the fortunes of the enemies also broke down simultaneously with their hearts.

Indeed, the crooked ones in the world have got ways of moving which are very ingenious in striking others. He had a son (named Samaragravira), who possesses prudence, prowess, and good conduct, whose two feet fordled too much with hundreds of diadems of mighty kings (bowing down). He has the foremost warrior in the battlefields and his fame was equal to that earned by Yudishtira, Paracara, Bhimasena, Karna and Arjuna. The multitude of dust of the earth, raised by the feet of his army, moving in the field of battle, was first blown up to the sky by the wind, produced by the moving on the earth (again) by the inchor, poured forth from the cheeks of the elephants.

By continuous existence of whose fame the world was altogether without the dark fortnight, just like the family of the lord of the daityas (demons) was without the partisanship of Khrisna. As Paulomi was known to be (the wife of) the lord of the Suras (i.e. Indra), Rati the wife of the mind-born (Kama), the daughter of the mountain (Parvati) of the enemy of Kama (i.e. Shiva), and Lakshmi of the enemy of Mura (i.e. Vishnu), so Tara was the queen consort of that king, and was the daughter of the great ruler Dharmasetu of the lunar race and resembled Tara (the Buddhist goddess of this name) herself. As the son of Suddhodana (i.e. the Buddha) the conqueror of Kamadeva, was born of Maya, and Skanda, who delighted the heart of the host of gods, was born or Uma by Shiva, was born of her by that king the illustrious Balaputra, who was expert in cruising the pride of all the rulers of the world, and before whose footstool (the seat where his lotus feet rested) the group princes bowed.

With the mind attracted by the manifold excellences of Nalanda and through devotion to the sun of Suddhodana (the Buddha) and having realized that riches was fickle like the waves of a mountain stream, he whose fame was like that of Sanghartamitra.

This might possibly meant that his wealth befriended the cause of the Sangha. Built there (at Nalanda) a monastery which was the abode of the assembly of monks of various good qualities and was white the series of stuccoed and lofty dwellings. Having requested, King Devapaladeva who was the preceptor for initiating into widowhood the wives of all the enemies, through envoys, very respectfully and out of devotion and issuing a charter, (he) granted these five villages whose purpose had been motived above for the welfare of himself, his parents and the world. As long as there is continuance of the ocean, or the Ganges has her limbs (the currents of water) agitated by the extensive plaited hair of Hara (Shiva), as long as the immovable king of snakes (Shesa) lightly bears the heavy and extensive earth every day, and as long as the (Udaya) Eastern and (Asta) Western mountains have their crest jewels scratched by the hoofs of the horses of the Sun, so long may this meritorious act, setting up virtues over the world, endure."
