= Sanjaya of Mataram =

King of Mataram

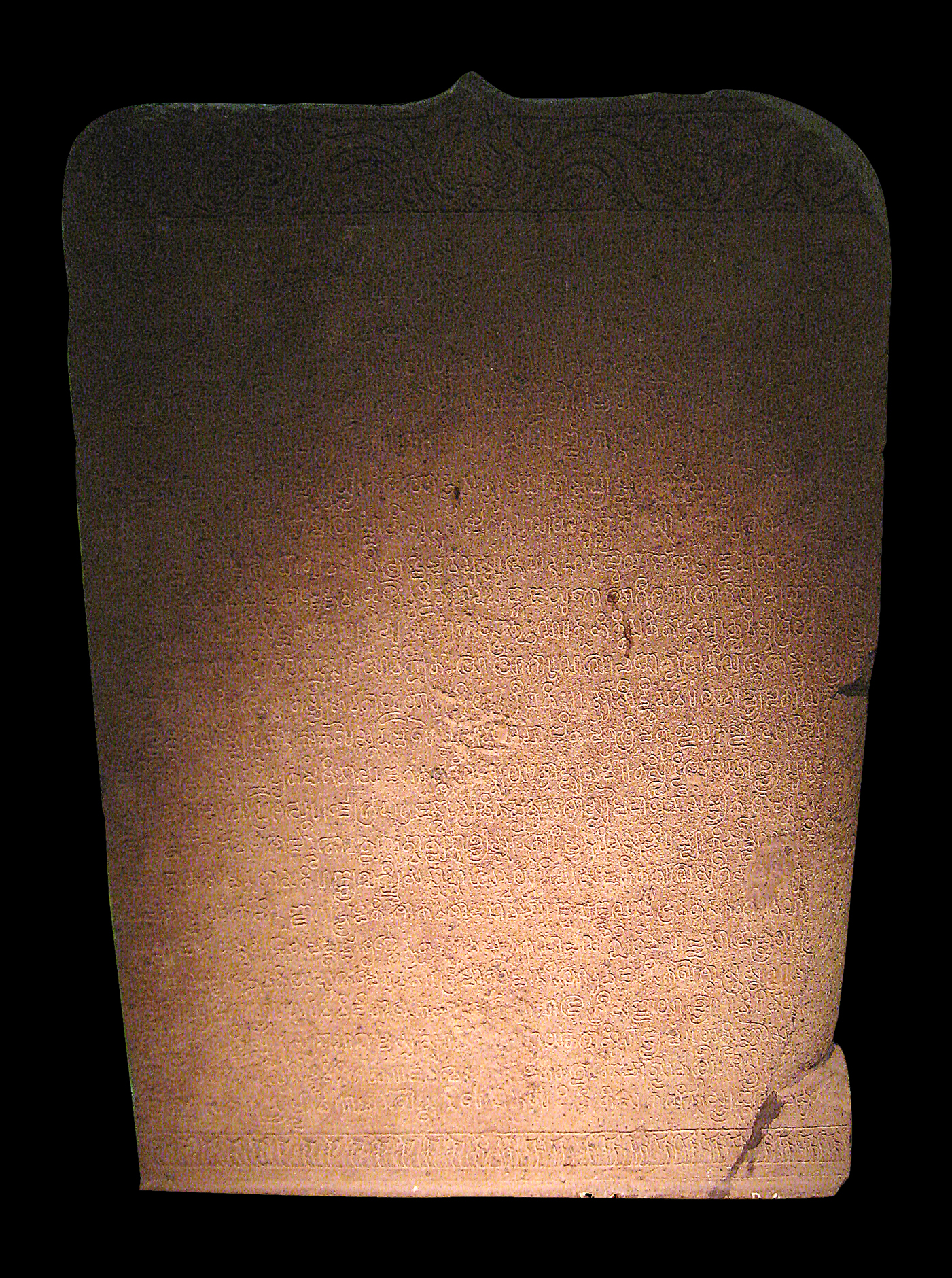
- Canggal inscription, the earliest inscription mentioned about King Sanjaya of Mataram

Maharaja of Mataram
- Reign: 732–760
- Predecessor: Monarchy established
- Successor: Dyah Pancapana
Regnal name
- Narapati Raja Śrī Sañjaya (Canggal) and Rakai Matarām Saŋ Ratu Sañjaya (Mantyasih)
- Dynasty: Sanjaya
- Religion: Shaivism

Sanjaya (Sanskrit: सञ्जय, romanized: sañjaya, lit. 'conquest, victory, triumphant'; 716 AD – 746) was the founder of the Mataram kingdom during the 8th century. His name was carved in the Sanskrit Canggal inscription which was found at the Gunung Wukir temple that stood on Wukir or Ukir hill (about 340 m (1,120 ft) high) on the southern Kedu Plain in Central Java.

Another recorded source of Sanjaya's history and his successors is found in the Balitung charter and the Wanua Tengah III inscription. In the Mantyasih inscription, King Balitung mentions what is called 'the builders of keraton', starting from Rakai Mataram (Sanjaya) and followed successively by Maharaja Rakai Panangkaran, Panunggalan, Warak, Garung, Rakai Pikatan, Kayuwangi, Watuhumalang and Watukura (which is Balitung himself). Several inscriptions of Balitung's successor, Daksha, used a dating system based on the year of Sanjaya's accession, which L.C. Damais has calculated as 638 Śaka (716 AD).

Sanjaya is known as the founder and first king of the Mataram Kingdom. The name King Sanjaya Saga was also mentioned in the old romanticized and mythical Sundanese manuscript Carita Parahyangan (or Parahyangan Story) dated from a later period, in which Sanjaya was portrayed as the Sundanese king and hero of Galuh.

== Sanjaya or Shailendra dynasty ==
Bosch suggested that Sanjaya was the progenitor of the Sanjaya dynasty, and two dynasties ruled Central Java; the Buddhist Sailendra and the Shivaist Sanjaya dynasty. The inscription also states that Sanjaya was an ardent follower of Shaivism. The latter was forced to move eastward by Sanjaya as written in an old Chinese report, which named Sanjaya as Chi-Yen.

Yet other historians argued that there was no such thing as the Sanjaya dynasty since there was only one dynasty mentioned in inscriptions called Sailendra that ruled central Java. This theory was proposed by Poerbatjaraka and suggested that there was only one kingdom and one dynasty; the kingdom was called Mataram with the capital in the Poh Pitu area, and the ruling dynasty was Shailendra. He holds that Sanjaya and all of his offspring belong to the Sailendra family initially were Shivaists. The association of Sailendra with Mahayana Buddhism began after the conversion of Raja Sankhara (Rakai Panaraban or Panangkaran) to Buddhism.

== Canggal inscription ==
According to the Canggal inscription, Sanjaya commissioned the erection of a lingam (the symbol of Shiva) on the hill of Kunjarakunja. The lingam is sited on the noble island of Yawadwipa (Java), which the inscription describes as blessed with an abundance of rice and gold. Yawadwipa, the inscription says, had long been under the rule of the wise and virtuous king Sanna, but fell after his death into disunity. Amid a period of confusion Sanjaya, son of Princess Sannaha (the sister of King Sanna) ascended to the throne. Sanjaya mastered holy scriptures, and martial arts, and displayed military prowess. After the conquest of neighboring areas, his reign was peaceful and prosperous.

This inscription describes Sanjaya as the legitimate successor of the previous king of Java, Sanna. After Sanna's kingdom fell into disunity, Sanjaya reunited the kingdom and ascended to the throne. By erecting a Shivaic lingam he demonstrates the establishment of the new authority, a new center of political power or court (kraton). Sanjaya's accession to his throne was proclaimed in the Ukir inscription. An analysis of the inscription, which was marked as a warning to vassal states and defeated kings, suggests that the Ukir Hill was the first center of the Mataram Kingdom. Sanjaya or his successor Dyah Pancapana (AD 746–784) later moved the kraton between AD 742–755, as written in a Chinese annal.

== See also ==
- Sanjaya dynasty
- Shailendra dynasty
- Mataram kingdom

Preceded by -	Monarch of Mataram; 716–746	Succeeded by Panangkaran
