= Regency (Indonesia) =

Indonesian administrative division

A regency (Indonesian: kabupaten; (Note: Old spelling keboepatén) Indonesian pronunciation: [kabuˈpat̪ɛn]), sometimes incorrectly referred to as a district (Note: Example of this incorrect usage is in machine translation services such as Google Translate. "District" to refer to regencies is incorrect as "districts" legally refers to what is called kecamatan or distrik in Indonesian) and previously known as second-level region, (Note: Indonesian: kabupaten daerah tingkat II, this was the official name until the implementation of Act Number 22 of 1999.) is an administrative division of Indonesia, directly under a province and on the same level with city (kota). Regencies are divided into districts (Kecamatan in most of Indonesia, but known as Distrik in Indonesian Papua, or Kapanewon and Kemantren in the Special Region of Yogyakarta). The average area of Indonesian regencies is about 4,578.29 km^{2} (1,767.69 sq mi), with an average population of 670,958 people. Most regencies on the island of Java have their regency capitals as the titular name of their regency.

The English name "regency" comes from the Dutch colonial period, when regencies were ruled by bupati (or regents) and were known as regentschap in Dutch (kabupaten in Javanese and subsequently Indonesian). Bupati had been regional lords under the precolonial monarchies of Java. When the Dutch abolished or curtailed those monarchies, the bupati were left as the most senior indigenous authority. They were not, strictly speaking, "native rulers" because the Dutch claimed full sovereignty over their territory, but in practice, they had many of the attributes of petty kings, including elaborate regalia and palaces and a high degree of impunity.

== Etymology ==
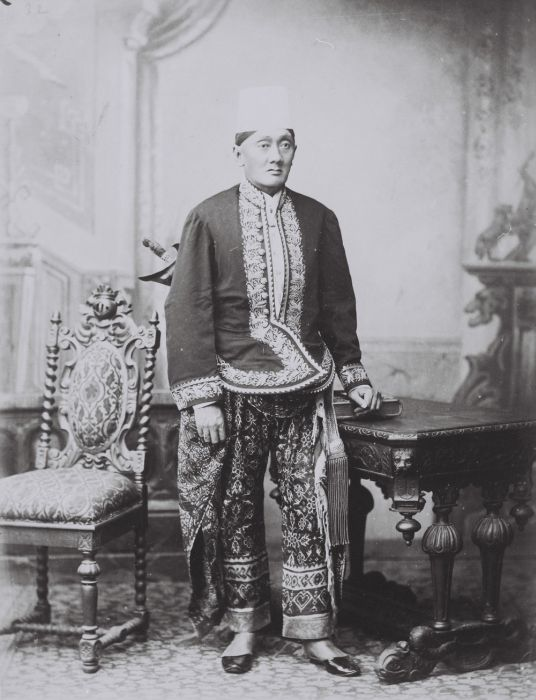
Portrait of a Javanese regent in gala uniform (c. 1900).

The Indonesian title of bupati is originally a loanword from Sanskrit, a shortening of the Sanskrit title bhumi-pati (bhumi भूमि '(of the) land' + pati पति 'lord', hence bhumi-pati 'lord of the land'). In Indonesia, bupati was originally used as a Javanese title for regional rulers in precolonial kingdoms, its first recorded usage being in the Telaga Batu inscription, which dates to the Srivijaya period, in which bhupati is mentioned among the titles of local rulers who paid allegiance to Sriwijaya's kings. Related titles which were also used in precolonial Indonesia are adipati ('duke') and senapati ('lord of the army' or 'general').

== Pre-independence period ==
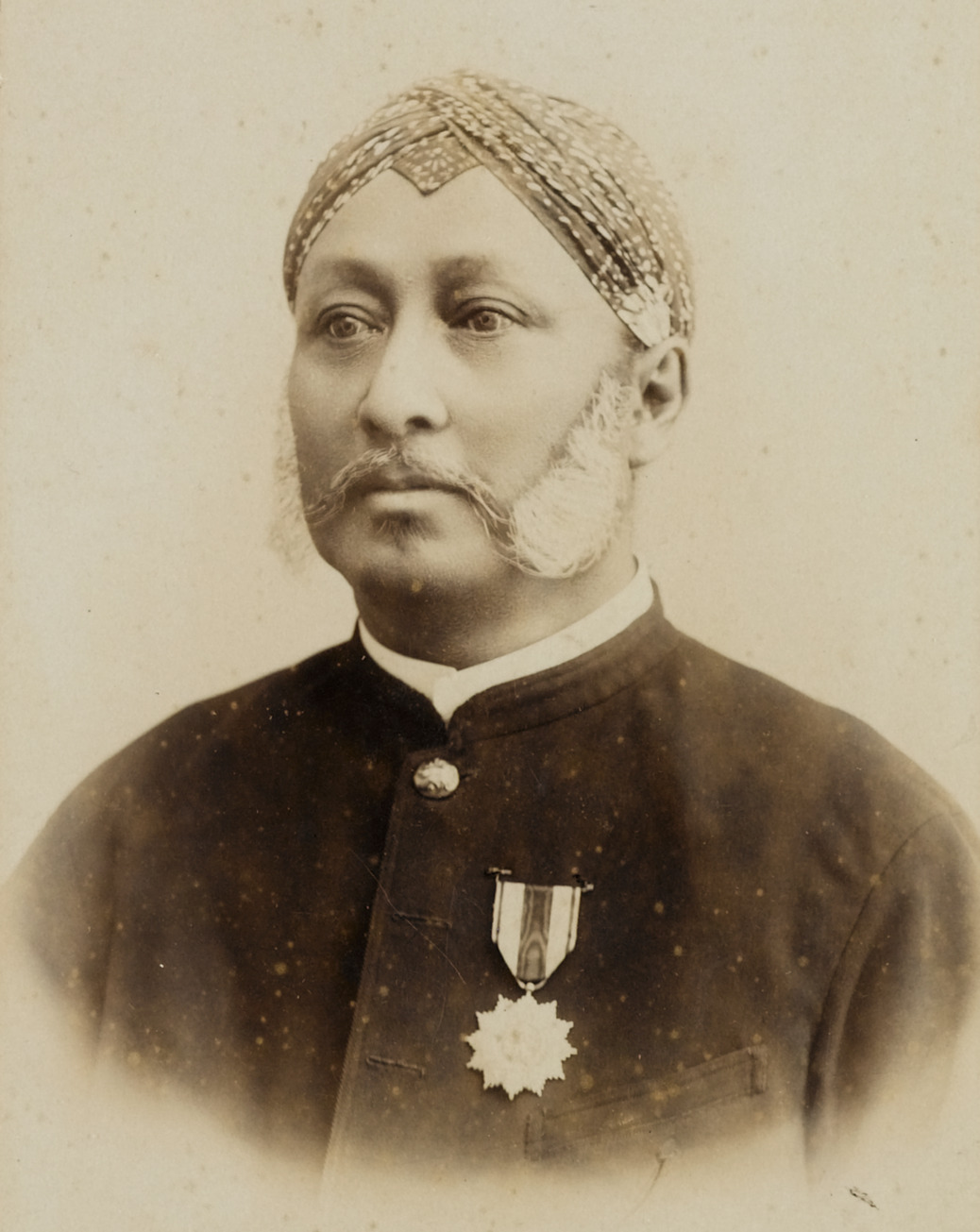
Sosroningrat, Regent of Jepara 1881–1905

Regencies in Java territorial units were grouped together into residencies headed by exclusively European residents. This term hinted that the residents had a quasi-diplomatic status in relation to the bupati (and indeed they had such a relationship with the native rulers who continued to prevail in much of Indonesia outside Java), but in practice the bupati had to follow Dutch instructions on any matter of concern to the colonial authorities. Like the current system of government in Indonesia, the system of historical times is still in effect.

The relationship between those sides was ambivalent: while legal and military power rested with the Dutch government (or, for a long time, with the Dutch East India Company) under a Governor General in Batavia on Java, the regents held higher protocollary rank than the assistant-resident who supposedly advised them and held day-to-day sway over the population. After the independence of Indonesia in 1945, the terms bupati and kabupaten were applied throughout the archipelago to the administrative unit below the residency (karesidenan).

In the Telaga Batu inscription, which was found in the village near Palembang and contains a worship of the king of Srivijaya, there may be the word bhupati. The inscription is estimated to be from the end of the 7th century AD, Indonesia inscription expert Johannes Gijsbertus de Casparis translated bhupati with the term head (hoofd in Dutch), the word bhupati is also found in the Ligor inscription, which was found in the Nakhon Si Thammarat province of Thailand. In the 17th century, Europeans called the area Ligor. this inscription was identified in 775 AD 8th century AD, the term bhupati was used to refer to the king of Srivijaya Hujunglangit in the 9th century AD

== Recent history ==
Since the start of the Reform Era in 1998 a remarkable secession of regency governments has arisen in Indonesia. The process has become known as pemekaran (division). Following the surge of support for decentralisation across Indonesia which occurred following the fall of Soeharto in 1998, key new decentralisation laws were passed in 1999. Subsequently, there was a jump in the number of regencies (and cities) from around 300 at the end of 1998 to 514 in 2014 sixteen years later. This secession of new regencies, welcome at first, has become increasingly controversial within Indonesia because the administrative fragmentation has proved costly and has not brought the hoped-for benefits.

Senior levels of the administration expressed a general feeling that the process of pemekaran needed to be slowed (or even stopped for the time being), although local politicians at various levels across government in Indonesia continue to express strong populist support for the continued creation of new regencies. Indeed, no further regencies or independent cities have been created since 2014, with the last being Central Buton, South Buton, and West Muna regencies in Southeast Sulawesi, all created on 23 July. However, a paper on fiscal decentralization and regional income inequality in 2019 argued that fiscal decentralization reduces regional income inequality.

Since 1998, a large portion of governance have been delegated from central government in Jakarta to local regencies, with regencies now playing important role in providing services to Indonesian people. Direct elections for regents and mayors began in 2005, with the leaders previously being elected by local legislative councils.

== Statistics ==
As of 2025, there are 416 regencies in Indonesia, and 98 cities. 120 of these are in Sumatra, 85 are in Java, 37 are in Nusa Tenggara, 47 are in Kalimantan, 70 are in Sulawesi, 17 are in Maluku, and 40 in Papua.

== See also ==
- List of regencies and cities of Indonesia
- City status in Indonesia
- Subdivisions of Indonesia
- Regency seat
- Other similar administrative divisions found outside Indonesia:
  - County (United States)
  - Ceremonial counties of England
  - Municipalities of Mexico
  - Departments of France
  - Provinces of Spain
  - Provinces of Italy
  - Districts of Germany
