= Balaputra =

- Maharaja of Srivijaya
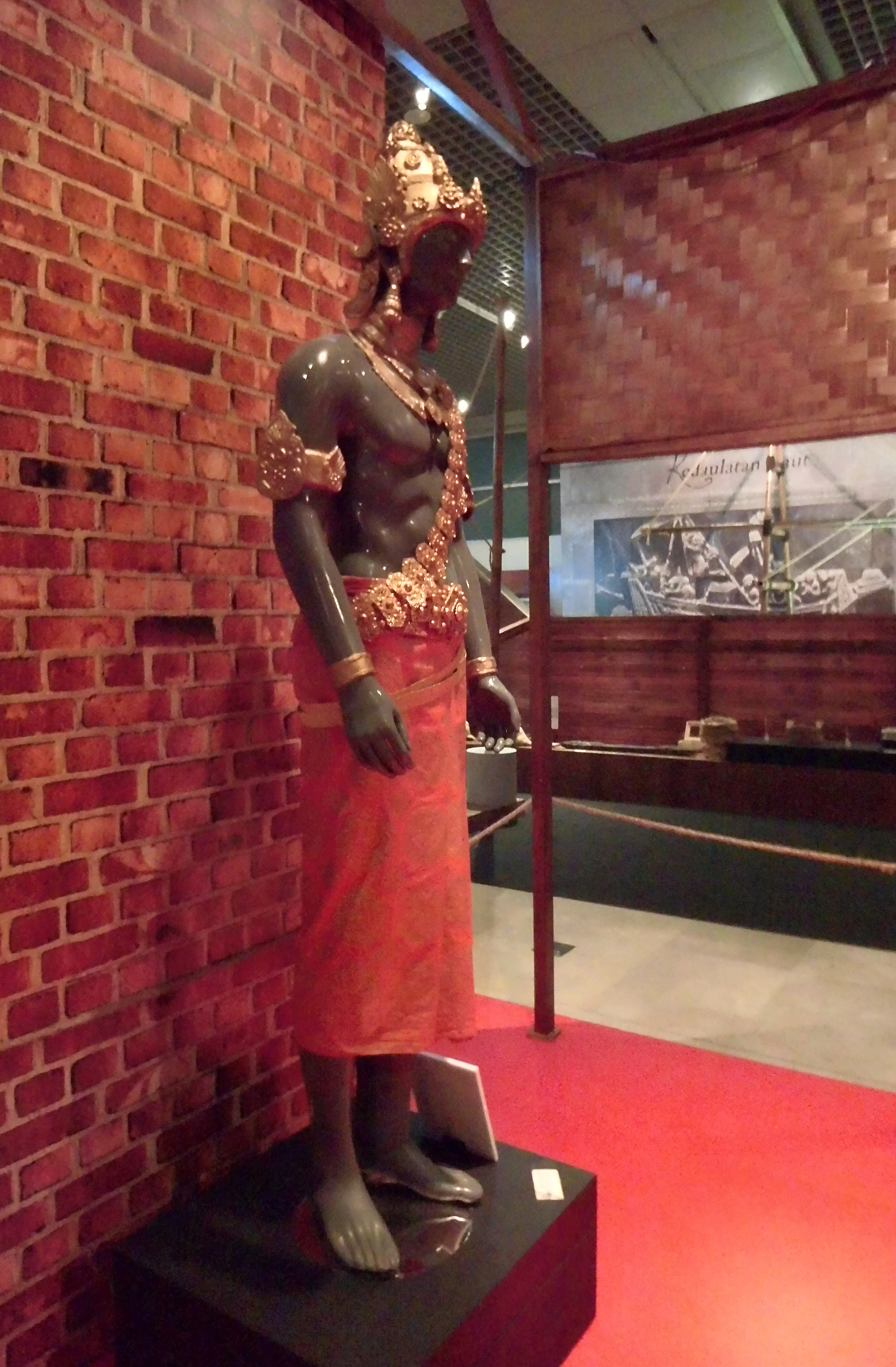
- The depiction of Balaputradewa, the king of Srivijaya in 9th century, displayed in "Kedatuan Sriwijaya" exhibition in November 2017. National Museum of Indonesia, Jakarta, Indonesia.

Srivijayan Emperor
- Reign: 835–860?
- Predecessor: Position established
- Successor: Sri Indrawarman
- Valaputradeva

Balaputradewa was the maharaja of Srivijaya in the 9th century CE as well as the former head of the Sailendra dynasty. He was the youngest son of the preceding Sailendran maharaja, Samaratunga, through marriage with Dewi Tara who was in turn the daughter of another maharaja, Dharmasetu of Srivijaya.

== Early life ==
Samaratunga died when Balaputra was a boy. As a young heir to the throne, his authority in Central Java was frequently challenged by local landlords. An extended family member by the name of Garung forced Balaputra to accept his tutorship. Garung was part of the Sanjaya dynasty and was related to Balaputra through the marriage of Garung's son, Rakai Pikatan to Pramodhawardhani, Balaputra's sister. During the regency of Garung, the Javanese political landscape was relatively peaceful. The regency ended in 832 when Garung disappeared.

== Sri Maharaja of Suvarnadvipa, King of Srivijaya ==
Around 852, Rakai Pikatan of Sanjaya began garnering influence from the local nobles. This worried Balaputra and he tried to suppress Rakai Pikatan to regain control. His effort failed miserably, however, due to his inexperience. The Sailendras were eventually forced to leave Java for Palembang, the seat of Srivijaya as well as the home of Balaputra's mother, Tara. Balaputra's defeat by Jatiningrat (Pikatan) was recorded in the Shivagrha inscription that recorded that Balaputra had constructed a fortress made of hundreds of heaped stones for his refuge. With the retreat, Central Java fell into the hands of Sanjaya, ending the Sailendra's rule over the area. The Sanjayas later founded the Mataram kingdom and continued to rule Java until Srivijaya reasserted its dominance over the island in the 11th century.

Soon after he left Java, Balaputra became the ruler of Srivijaya. While the record on Balaputra is scarce, it is known through the Nalanda inscription that he ordered the construction of a Buddhist monastery in Nalanda, India. He also sent an ambassador to China.
