= Samaragrawira =

Javanese monarch

Sri Maharaja Samaragrawira or also known as Rakai Warak was a ruler of the Mataram kingdom of Central Java from approximately 800 to 819. This name is found in the list of kings of Mataram in the Mantyasih inscription.

One theory put forward by historian Slamet Muljana suggests that the original name is Samaragrawira, the father of Balaputradewa, King of Srivijaya.

Preceded by Dharanindra	Monarch of Mataram Kingdom and Srivijaya; 800—819	Succeeded by Samaratungga
