= Ngawen =

8th-century Buddhist site in Indonesia

Coordinates: 7°36′15″S 110°16′21″E

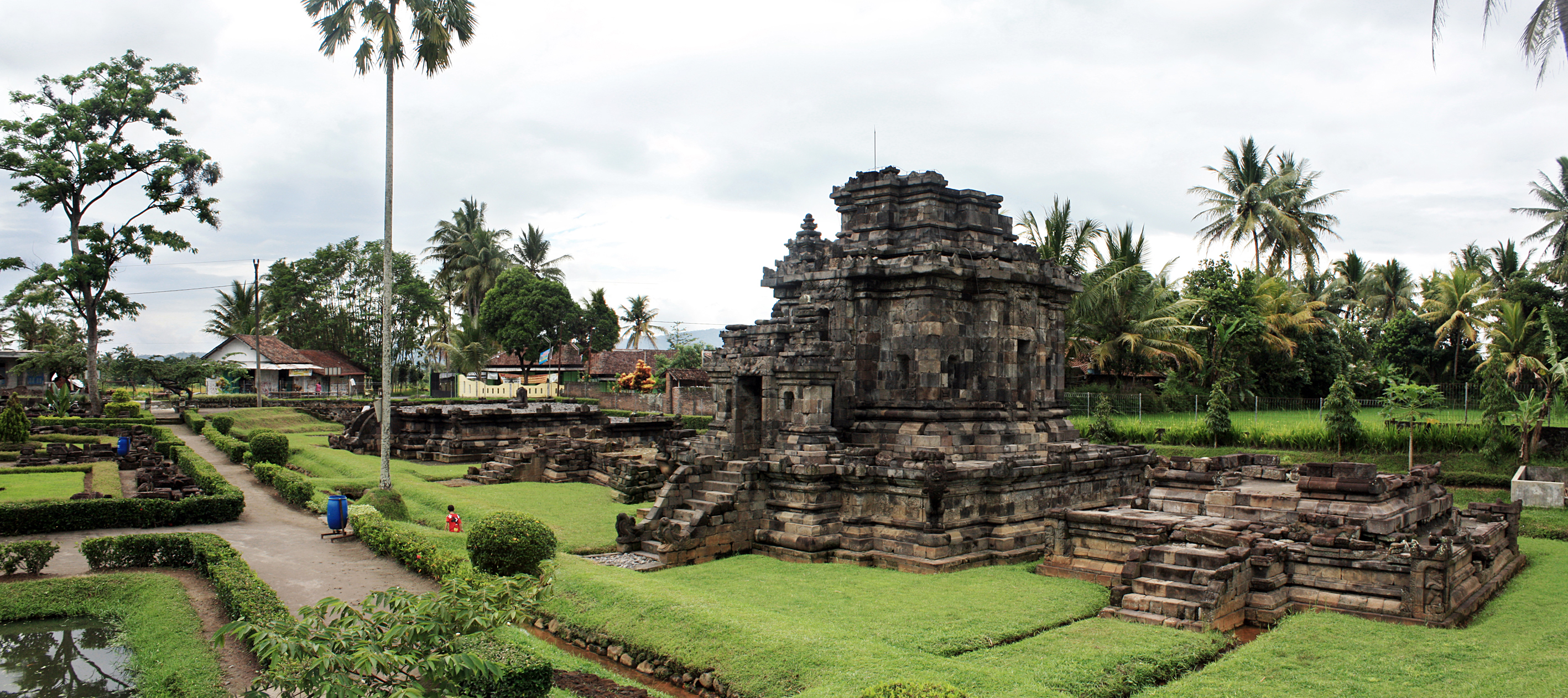
Ngawen temple compound is viewed from the northeast corner.

Ngawen (known locally as Candi Ngawen) is an 8th-century Buddhist temple compound in Magelang Regency, Central Java, Indonesia. Located in Ngawen village, Muntilan sub-district, 6 km (3.7 mi) to the east of Mendut temple or 5 km (3.1 mi) to the south of Muntilan town center. Ngawen temple compound consists of five temples, however, today only one is successfully reconstructed.

Ngawen is thought to be connected with the other three Buddhist temples nearby — Mendut, Pawon, and Borobudur — all of which were built during the Sailendra dynasty (8th–9th centuries). According to the satellite map observation, the four temples; Borobudur, Pawon, Mendut and Ngawen are actually forming a straight line spanning west to east slightly tilted northeast with eastern end pointing to the peak of Mount Merapi. From the detail and style of its carving, this temple is estimated to be slightly older than Borobudur. The temple is notable for its exquisite statues of rampant lions on each corners of the temples. Since its discovery in 1874, the temple has suffered looting and artifact theft.

== Architecture ==
The temple was made from andesite stone and built in typical Central Javanese candi temple architecture. The temple complex was built on site measures 3,556 square meter, sandwiched between a village and rice paddies. The temple complex consists of five temples creating a row of temples spanning north to south; two main temples and three perwara (ancillary) temples in between the main temples in alternating order. The temples are numbered according to their order from north to south; so temples no. 2 and 4 are larger main temples, while temples no. 1, 3 and 5 are ancillary smaller temples. Today, only northern main temple or temple number 2, was successfully reconstructed, the other four temples are still in ruins. The temples faces east and stands on a square base.

The northern main temple measures 13 meters by 12 meters base and is 7 metres in height. On each corner of the main temples, stands some exquisite statues of lions in rampant position. These lions of Ngawen temple are quite a unique feature among candis of Central Java. While the walls of the base display kinnaras. The stairs are on the east side. On each side of the stairs and the top of the gates are adorned with carved Kala-Makara, commonly found in classic Javanese temples. On the top of inner portal there is a carving of deities in svargaloka beneath a Kala's head. The outer walls of Ngawen main temple is carved with niches adorned with kala's head and the heavenly scene. The niches are now empty, it probably once contains the statues of Bodhisattvas or taras.

There is a headless stone statue of meditating Dhyani Buddha Ratnasambhava performing Varamudra stance inside the main square chamber. The roof section of is crowned with small ratnas pinnacles, however the upper parts of the roof is still missing, creating a gaping hole on top of the main chamber. The peculiar thing is the roof section was adorned with ratna and not a stupa. There are both Hindu and Buddhist symbolism founds in this temple. Ratna pinnacles are most commonly found in Hindu temples in Java. This led to suggestions that the temple was initially built as a Hindu temple, but later converted to a Buddhist temple during its expansion and renovation. Experts suggested that the five temples are dedicated to Five Dhyani Buddhas, the Buddhist guardian of directions. They are Amitabha the ruler of the West, Ratnasambhawa for the South, Akshobhya for the East, Vairocana for the Zenith and Amoghasiddhi for the North. However, the last three statues have been lost from the Ngawen temples.

== History ==
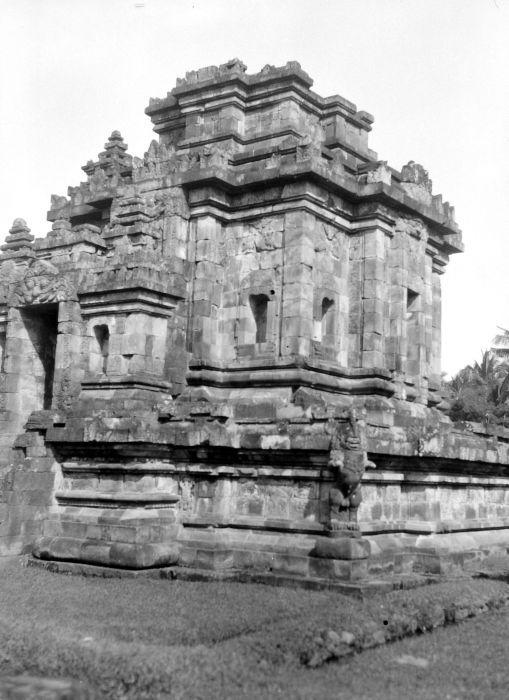
Candi Ngawen in 1929.

Examination of the style of Ngawen architecture, symbolism and carving, suggests that the temple was built around late 8th-century, slightly older than Borobudur. The original name of this Buddhist shrine is uncertain. "Ngawen" literally derived from Old Javanese word awi which means "bamboo". The Karangtengah inscription, dated 824 CE mentioned that King Indra of Sailendra has built a sacred building named Venuvana which means "bamboo forest". Dutch archaeologist JG de Casparis has connected the temple mentioned in Karangtengah inscription with Mendut temple. However, another suggestion presented by Soekmono argued that the Karangtengah inscription was probably refer to the Ngawen temple instead, based upon the etymological link between the name Ngawen village and Venuvana, for both words contains reference to "bamboo". The temple's actual base was buried two metres beneath the current ground level, suggest that the temple was probably covered by Mount Merapi volcanic ejecta for over a thousand years.

The local Javanese villagers has been aware of the temple's ruin presence since 19th-century. The first official observations were conducted by Dutch archeologist Holpermand in 1874. In 1911, Van Erp mentioned Ngawen temple in his commentary, that the temples were destroyed by a Mount Merapi eruption. PJ Perquin, another Dutch archeologist, studied Ngawen in 1925 and successfully restored one of the five temples; the northern main temple (temple No.2).

The temple suffered looting in the 1970s when two statue heads were stolen. Other looting incidents were reported in 1999.

== See also ==
- Ancient temples of Java
- Buddhism in Indonesia
- Candi of Indonesia
- Indonesian Esoteric Buddhism
- Borobudur
- Mendut
- Pawon
