= Dharanindra =

Dharanindra, also known Indra and Śrī Saṅgrāmadhanañjaya, was the ruler of the Sailendra dynasty who was the King of Mataram in Central Java and possibly also of Srivijaya in South Sumatera. He has been described as a great conqueror and is credited for the Sailendras' overseas campaign.

He was mentioned in Kelurak inscription (dated 782) in his formal reign name Sri Sanggramadhananjaya. This inscription was issued during the reign of King Panangkaran, so it is possible that Sanggramadhananjaya and Panangkaran were the same person. In this inscription he was hailed as Wairiwarawiramardana or "the slayer of courageous enemies". The similar title also found in Ligor B inscription discovered in Southern Thailand Malay Peninsula; Sarwwarimadawimathana, which suggest it referred to the same person.

Saṅgrāmadhanañjaya seems to be a warlike character, as he is believed to have embarked on military naval expedition overseas and brought Sailendra control to Ligor in Malay Peninsula. After conquering and taking Ligor back from Water Chenla, he also launched raids against Champa in 774 and 770, and conquered Southern Cambodia in Mekong delta in early 9th century. During this time, Jayavarman II from Java, was probably the commander of the Śailendra (Medang Kingdom) army. At the behest of Maharaja of Medang (Dharaindra), Jayavarman II was installed as a new Cambodia king and Angkor Dynasty was founded.

Saṅgrāmadhanañjaya seems to have continued the builder tradition of his predecessors. He continued and completed the construction of Manjusrigrha temple, and according to the Karangtengah inscription (dated 824) responsible for the construction of Venuvana temple, connected to Mendut or probably Ngawen temple. He was also probably responsible for the conception, planning and initial phase of construction of Borobudur and Pawon temple.
