= Samaratungga =

Emperor of the Sailendra dynasty

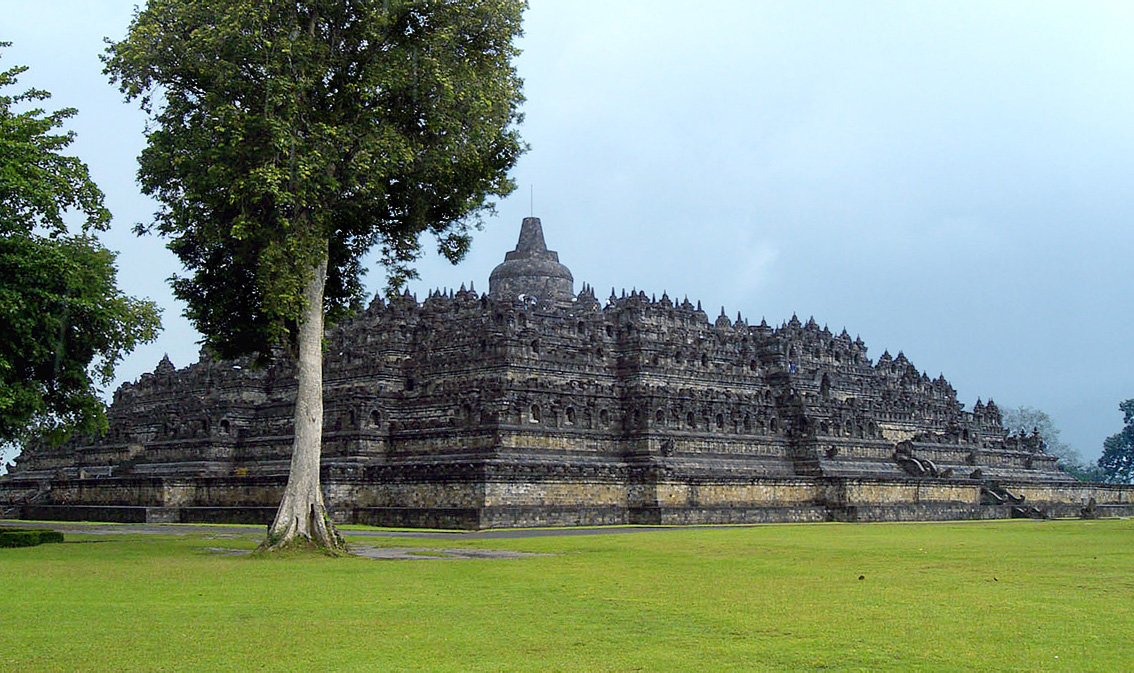
Borobudur, the largest Buddhist structure in the world built by the Sailendra dynasty under Samaratungga

Samaratungga was the head of the Sailendra dynasty which ruled the Mataram Kingdom and Srivijaya in the 8th and 9th centuries. He was the successor of King Indra, and his name was mentioned in the Karangtengah inscription dated 824 CE as the constructor of a sacred Buddhist building called Venuvana (Sanskrit: bamboo forest) to place the cremated ashes of his predecessor King Indra of Sailendra. During his administration, he initiated the construction of a massive Buddhist monument Borobudur. Samaratungga married Dewi Tara, the princess of Srivijayan ruler Dharmasetu, which created a close political alliance between the Sailendras and Srivijaya.

Samaratungga had one son by the name of Balaputra and one daughter Pramodhawardhani. After Samaratungga died, Pramodhawardhani married the Shivaite Rakai Pikatan from the Sanjaya dynasty. Rakai Pikatan managed to usurp Balaputra's authority over Central Java and forced the Saleidras to flee Java for Srivijaya.

Under the reign of Samaratungga too, Jayavarman II was appointed as the governor of Indrapura in the Mekong Delta. Jayavarman later revoked his allegiance to the Sailedras and Srivijaya to form the Khmer Empire.

| Preceded by Samaragrawira | Monarch of Medang Kingdom and Srivijaya; 812—833 | Succeeded by Pramodhawardhani and Rakai Pikatan |
