= Dharmasetu =

Historical Indian ruler

Dharmasetu was an 8th-century Maharaja of Srivijaya. Under his reign, he successfully incorporated Pan Pan, a kingdom located in the north of the Malay Peninsula, into the Srivijayan sphere of influence before 775 CE.

At an old monastery of Nakhon Si Thammarat in modern-day Thailand, there is a stele indicating that Dharmasetu ordered the construction of three sanctuaries dedicated to Bodhisattvas Padmapani, Vajrapani, and Buddha in Ligor.

The inscription further states that Dharmasetu was the head of the Sailendra dynasty that ruled Java. This is the first instance of a relationship known to have existed between Srivijaya and the Sailendra. Dewi Tara, the daughter of Dharmasetu, later married a member of the Sailendra dynasty by the name of Samaratunga who later assumed the throne of Srivijaya around 792. The relationship between Srivijaya and the Sailendra became intimately close afterwards.

He was succeeded by his son-in-law Sangramadhananjaya around 782.
