= Ligor inscription =

Words inscribed on stone in Thailand

The Ligor inscription is an 8th-century stone stele or inscription discovered in Ligor, Nakhon Si Thammarat, Southern Thailand Malay Peninsula. This inscription was written and carved on two sides, the first part is called the Ligor A inscription, also known as the Viang Sa inscription, while on the other side is called the Ligor B inscription written in Kawi script dated 775 CE. The Ligor B inscription was probably written by Mahārāja dyāḥ Pañcapaṇa kariyāna Paṇaṃkaraṇa (Panangkaran), king of the Shailendra dynasty. This inscription was connected to the kingdom of Srivijaya and the Shailendra dynasty.

== Interpretation ==
The Ligor A inscription tells about a king of Srivijayan, named as the king of kings in the world, who built the Trisamaya caitya for Kajara.

The Ligor B inscription, dated 775 CE, written in Kawi script, contains the information about a king named Visnu who holds the title Sri Maharaja, from Śailendravamśa (Wangsa Syailendra) hailed as Śesavvārimadavimathana (the slayer of arrogant enemies without any trace). There are some different interpretations regarding the king mentioned in the Ligor A and B inscriptions. Most evidence indicates that the king mentioned in this inscription was the Javanese King Panangkaran,. Coedes speculates a link to his successor, King Dharanindra, based on the element 'Indra' which is found in the Kelurak Inscription, but this seems unlikely.
