= Shivagrha inscription =

Inscription from Central Java

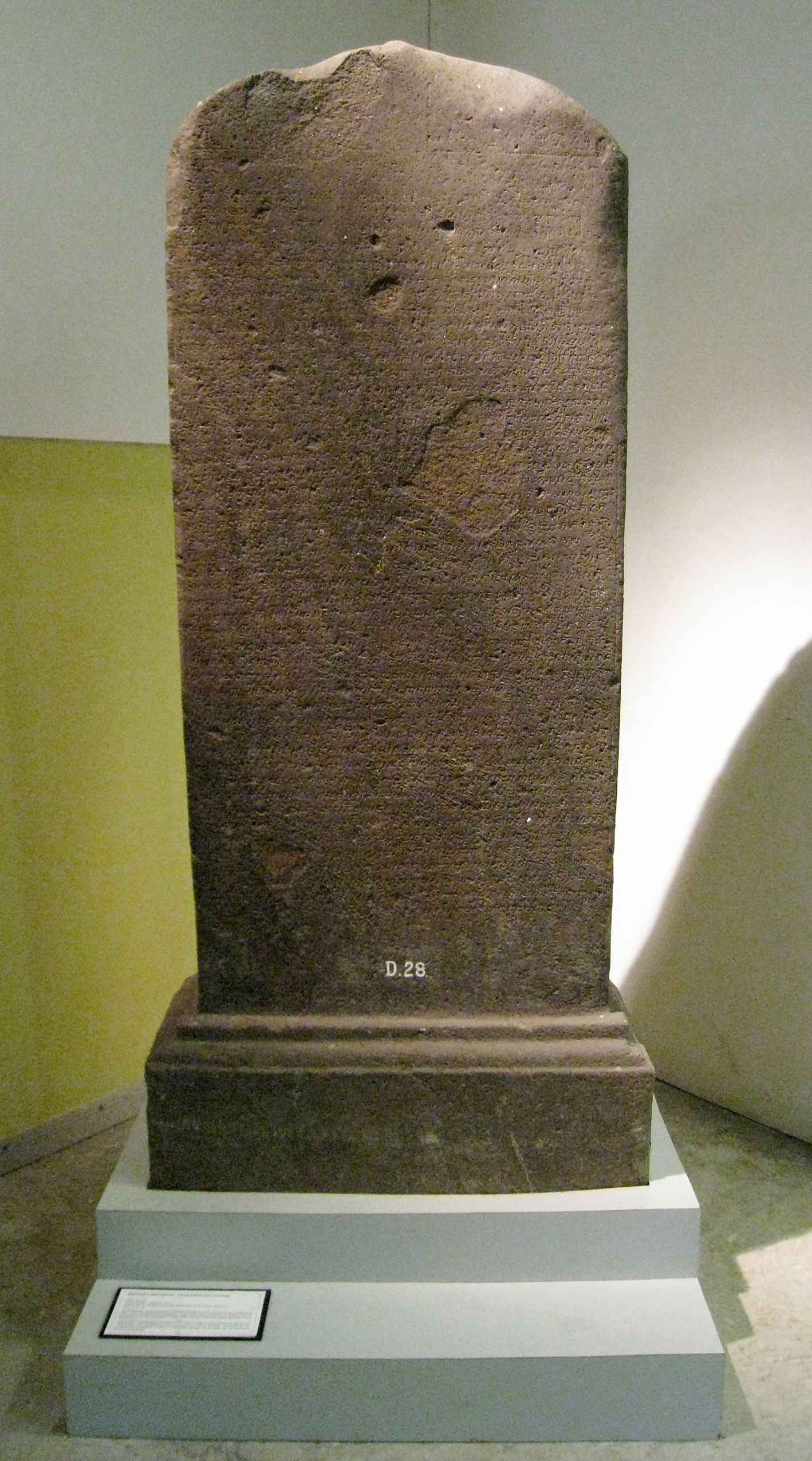
- Shivagrha inscription, displayed at National Museum of Indonesia, Jakarta
- Material: Andesite stone
- Created: 778 Saka or 856 CE
- Discovered: Prambanan, Yogyakarta, Indonesia
- Present location: National Museum of Indonesia, Jakarta
- Registration: D.28

The Shivagrha inscription is an inscription from the Mataram kingdom of Central Java, dated in chandrasengkala (chronogram) ”Wwalung Gunung sang wiku”, that is, the year 856 CE (or 778 in the native Saka Calendar). The inscription was inscribed by order of Dyah Lokapala (Rakai Kayuwangi) right after the end of Rakai Pikatan's reign and gave a detailed description of a grand temple compound dedicated to Shiva called Shivagrha ("the House of Shiva"), corresponding to the Prambanan temple compound.

A public water project to change the course of a river near Shivagrha Temple is also mentioned in this inscription. The river, identified as the Opak River, now runs north to south on the western side of the Prambanan temple compound. Historians suggest that originally the river was curved further to the east and was deemed too near to the main temple. The project was done by cutting the river along a north-to-south axis along the outer wall of the Shivagrha Temple compound. The former river course was filled in and made level to create a wider space for the temple expansion, the space for rows of pervara (complementary) temples.

Also mentioned is that the King (Pikatan) was a Shivaist, in contrast to his queen consort Pramodhawardhani, who was a Buddhist. The inscription mentions a battle for royal succession against Jatiningrat (Rakai Pikatan), the rebel having made a fortress of hundreds of stones for refuge. This fortress is connected to the site of Ratu Boko. Traditionally Balaputradewa was thought of as the person who led the war against Pikatan. However, this theory was revisited as it was more likely that it was Rakai Walaing pu Kumbayoni who challenged Pikatan's authority as the new monarch of the Mataram kingdom. Rakai Walaing was a powerful landlord who claimed to be the descendant of the king that once ruled Java.

Today the inscription is displayed in the National Museum of Indonesia, Jakarta, under the inventory number No. D.28.

== Contents ==
The translation was published by J.G. de Casparis

Stanzas 1–5 are insufficiently legible for translation.

6. The young prince ………, in possession of royal majesty (?), protected the country of Java, righteous and with …., majestic in battles and in feasts (?), full of fervour and perfect, victorious but free from passion, a Great King of excellent devotion.
7. He was a Shaiva in contrast to the queen, the spouse of the hero; exactly a year was the time of the …..; ….. stones heaped up by the hundreds for his refuge, a killer as fast as the wind ….. Bālaputra.
8. A king, perfect in (this) world, ……….., a protection for his comrades, indeed a hero who knew the duties of his rank; he adopted a name proper to a family of honourable Brahmanas (rich in) arts and virtues, and established his kĕraton at Mĕdang situated in the country (?) of Mamratipura.
9. After these (deeds), the king Jātiningrat (“Birth of the World”) resigned; the kingship and the kĕraton were handed over to his successor; Dyah Lokapāla, who was equal to a younger brother of the (divine) Lokapālas; free were the subjects, divided into the four āśramas (life stages) with the Brāhmanas ahead.
10. A royal order went out to the patih that he should prepare immaculate funeral ceremonies; without hesitation, Rakaki Mamrati gave (grounds) to Wantil; he was ashamed for the past, especially for the fact that the village Iwung had been the battlefield (?), (and) took the utmost care not to be equalled by him (?).
11. All his actions during the time he was here were inspired by a divine majesty; there were no enemies anymore; love for his (subjects) was what he always strove after. When he could at last dispose of power and riches, etc., it was only natural that sanctuaries were built by him, the Able One.
12. In addition, he possessed the knowledge, difficult to acquire, of Dharma and Adharma, but he was unable to conceal the lies of ….. The wicked ones ceased to act against him, ….. )?); this was the reason why the Halu, which you see now, was erected.
13. …. he, with his servants, all simple people, low-born men positions (?); excellent …. made them beautiful; who would have been unwilling to consent (?) in bringing their gift (?); (everybody) worked cheerfully.
14. ……, the heart (of the complex) with its own wall and bricks to construct the dam (?), for thus it was desired. Fierce doorkeepers ….., so that thieves would become afraid to …… being caught in taking away.
15. A beautiful dwelling of god ….; at the gateway, two small buildings were erected, different in construction; there also was a Taŋjung tree … together (?); beautiful were the number of small buildings to be used as hermitages, which might, in their turn, be an example (?).
16. Of the tree Ki Muhūr (?), the stem was only one year old; the neighborhood of the Lord was the reason of its matchless growth at the Eastern side; its beauty was extraordinary, equal to the (divine) Pārijātaka tree; it was the place where the god would descend and (its branches) would be a parasol (for the god); was not it a god for the god?.
17. (The smaller buildings) were equal, of equal height, (served) the same purpose, (expressed) the same thoughts, (but) they were each different in their number; who would hesitate in worshipping? Out of worship (people) gave. In a moment, the temples with the gateways and innumerable, immovable women, were completed by the surveyors working by the hundreds.
18. What would be comparable to this divine (building); it was there for a deification (?); was this the cause why the spectators were overwhelmed and the (normal) sensations did not come back (?)? The worshippers came in rows and in a groups (?), by the hundreds, without saying a word; extraordinary were their names... a token that they (the images worshipped?) would bring refreshment (?).
19. Who, then, would not be the very first to go and see? It was very charming ……
20. ...
21. ...
22. (transition to popular language); You herons, crows, swans, merchants,……; go and take a bath to find protection (?) …. (?) pilgrimage (?) ……; and you, kalang, village members and handsome gusti, you are ordered (?) to worship with smelling salts (?) …… with old men.
23. (omission to akṣara); On the day (fixed for) compulsory work on behalf of the gods, the people in command performed the ceremonies; crowds of people came in and the first surveyor came in the third place (?); monks, young men and women of rank, ….. (?); …….. (?); there were numerous guards (?).
24. (omission to anusvāra); In the time of the Saka year (denoted by) eight, mountains and monks, in the bright half of the month Mārgaçîrca, the eleventh lunar day, on a Thursday, Wagai (of the five days’ week) and Wukurung (of the six days’ week) ….. _ that was the date at which the (statue of the) god was finished and inaugurated.
25. After the Shiva sanctuary had been completed in its divine splendour, the (course of the) river was changed so that it rippled along the grounds; there was no danger from the wicked ones, for they had all received their due; then the grounds were inaugurated as temple grounds….. with the gods.
26. Two tampah was the size of the rice-fields belonging to the Shiva temple; it was a freehold of the Paměgět Wantil with his nayaka and his patih; the patih was called si Kling and his kalima was called rasi Mrěsi; there were three gustis; si Jana, rasi Kandut and rasi Sanab.
27. The winěkas was si Banyaga; the wahutas were Waranîyā, Tati and Wukul (?); the laduh was si Gěněng; the following persons were representatives, speaking in the name of other people, viz., Kabuh and sang Marsî, the later representing the village elders without definite function.
28. After the inauguration of the wet rice fields, the freehold existed, fixed to remain a freehold (?), …… (?), this was the freehold that would belong to the god forever (?).
29. Those (in charge) were sent back with the order to worship, every day, without forgetting their duties; they should not be negligent in obeying the commands of the gods; continuous rebirth in hell would be the result (if they were negligent).

== Other inscription from the region in same era ==
- Canggal inscription (732)
- Kalasan inscription (778)
- Kelurak inscription (782)
- Karangtengah inscription (824)
- Mantyasih inscription (907)
- Laguna Copperplate Inscription (900)
- Tri Tepusan inscription (842)
- Hinduism in Indonesia
- Hinduism in Java
- Indonesian Esoteric Buddhism

== See also ==
- Canggal inscription (732)
- Kalasan inscription (778)
- Kelurak inscription (782)
- Karangtengah inscription (824)
- Tri Tepusan inscription (842)
- Mantyasih inscription (907)
