= Dyah Pancapana =

2nd king of Mataram

Maharaja of Mataram
- Reign: 7 October 746 – 1 April 784
- Predecessor: Sanjaya
- Successor: Rakai Panaraban
- Born: Dyah Pancapana
Regnal name
- Śrī Mahārāja Dyaḥ Pañcapaṇa Kariyāna Paṇaṃkaraṇa Śrī Saṅgrāmadhanañjaya
Posthumous name
- Śrī Saṅgrāmadhanañjaya
- House: Shailendra dynasty
- Religion: Buddhism

Dyah Pancapana (7 October 746 – 1 April 784) or regnal name Śrī Mahārāja Dyaḥ Pañcapaṇa Kariyāna Paṇaṃkaraṇa Śrī Saṅgrāmadhanañjaya, was the second king of Mataram from the Shailendra dynasty whose kingdom was centered on the Java island Indonesia. He was the immediate successor of Sri Sanjaya, the founder of Sanjaya dynasty as mentioned in the Kalasan inscription. The name of Panangkaran is mentioned in the Balitung charter (found in the Kedu Plain area) as the line of kings who were named as the 'builders of kraton'.

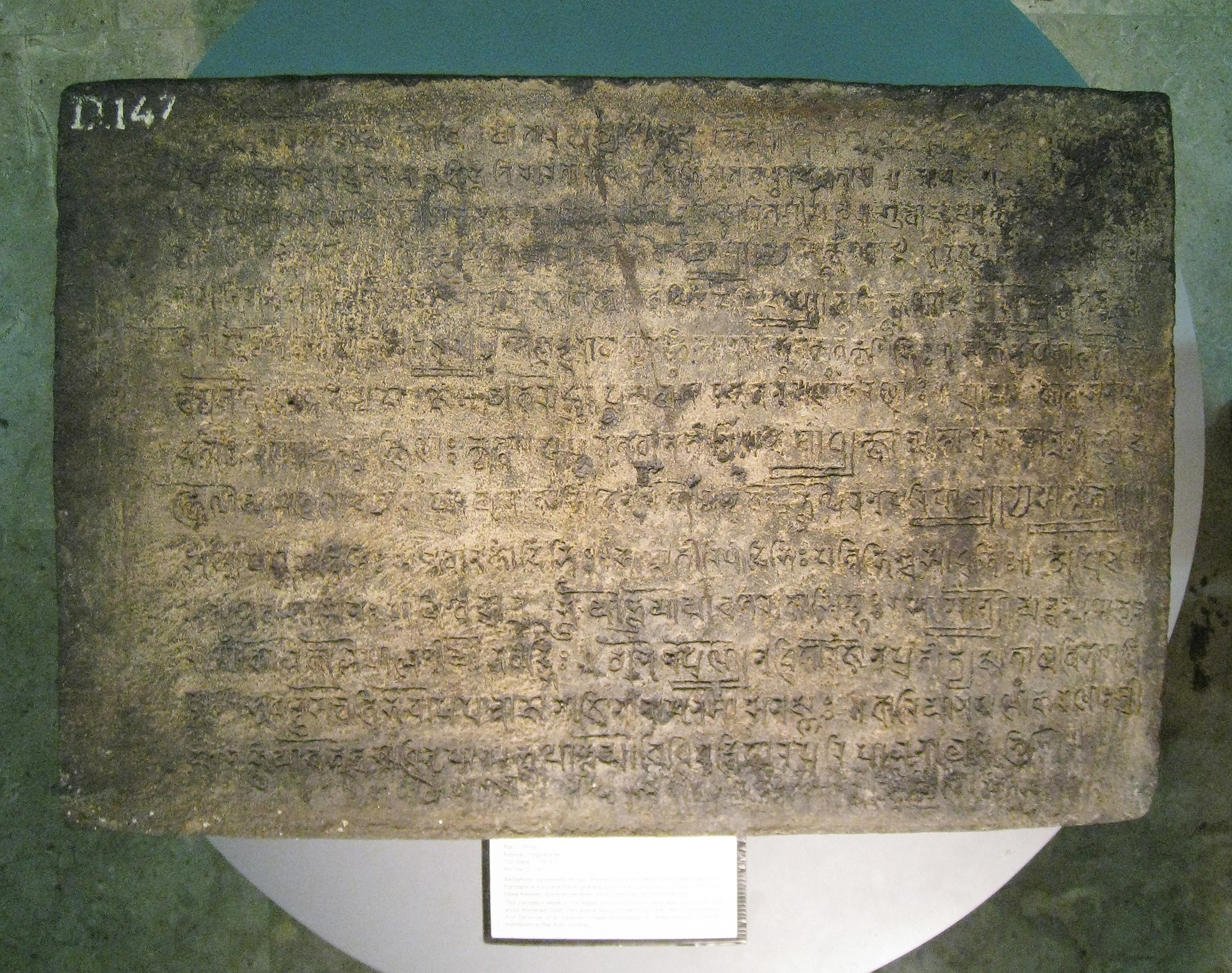
Kalasan inscription mentions the name Mahārājaṃ Dyāḥ Pañcapaṇaṃ Paṇaṃkaraṇāṃ

In the late 8th and early 9th centuries, Java observed rivalries between two dynasties. The first four Sanjaya dynasty lines after King Sanjaya (Panangkaran, Panunggalan, Warak and Garung), which was known as the Amrati Kings, competed over their power and religious influences with the Sailendras princes in the south of central Java who had arisen since 779. The Sanjayas were Hindus while Sailendras were Buddhists. There was only an isolated kingship in the east of Java, Gajayana, who appeared to have control over the Mount Kawi region in 760.

Although relationship between the Amrati Kings with Sailendra was important at that time, the rivalries between the two is still unclear. From the Kalasan and Ratu Boko inscriptions, there were stated that Panangkaran granted permission requested by the collective guru of the Sailendra king to build Buddhist sculptures, shrines and monasteries in honor to the goddess Tara. The construction was built under Panangkaran's supervision, but was supported by Sailendra's expenses. In order to show his respect to the guru, Panangkaran consented the building of the shrine by giving the village of Kalasan to the Buddhist community.

== Title ==
A king in the Mataram tradition has a birth name which is characterized by the naming of Abhisheka 'Dyah'. The title is always pinned to the king's children, both male or female.

== See also ==
- History of Indonesia

Preceded by Sanjaya	Maharaja of Mataram; 760—775	Succeeded by Rakai Panaraban
