= Kedu Plain =

Volcanic plain between Mount Sumbing and Mount Sundoro in Central Java, Indonesia

Coordinates: 7.608333°S 110.216667°E

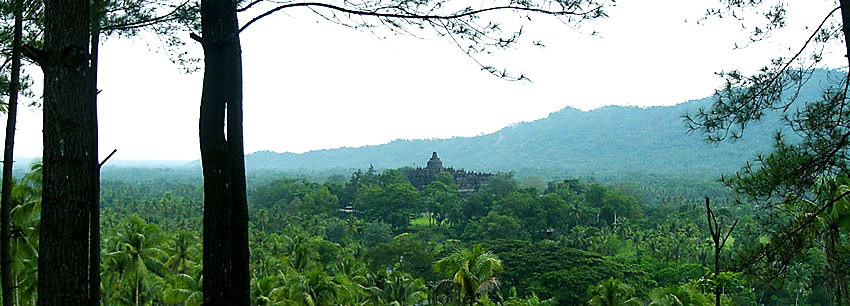
The fertile Kedu plain around Borobudur.

Kedu Plain, also known as Progo River Valley, is the fertile volcanic plain that lies between the volcanoes Mount Sumbing and Mount Sundoro to the west, and Mount Merbabu and Mount Merapi to the east. It roughly corresponds to the present-day Magelang and Temanggung Regency of Central Java, Indonesia.

Its northern border is limited by the hills of Kendal and Mount Ungaran. The plain also borders the Menoreh Hills in the southwest and Prambanan Plain in the southeast. The Progo River runs through the center of this plain, from its source on the slope of Mount Sundoro to the southern coast of Java facing the Indian Ocean. It has been a significant location in Central Javanese history for over a millennium, as it contains traces of the Sailendra dynasty as well as Borobudur and associated locations. During the colonial Dutch East Indies period, the Kedu Plain was located in the Kedu Residency, which at that time covered what are now the Magelang Regency, Magelang City, and Temanggung Regency administrative units.

When Britain briefly took control of the region in 1811, Magelang became the seat of government. After the Napoleonic wars had ended, the English returned Java back over to the Dutch in 1816 and Magelang continued to play a central role in the Dutch East Indies.

There is a small hill near Magelang called Mount Tidar that is referred to as the Nail of Java. According to Javanese legend, the gods placed the nail to prevent the island of Java from sinking into the sea from tremors.

The Kedu Plain gave birth to Wayang Kulit Kedu, a distinctive style of Javanese shadow theatre.

== Archaeological sites ==
The Kedu Plain hosts a large number of Hindu and Buddhist temples dated, from the 8th to the 9th century. Because of this, the Kedu Plain is considered the cradle of classic Indonesian civilization. The temples in the region include:

- Borobudur: The gigantic 8th-century stone mandala Buddhist monument was built by the Sailendras.
- Mendut: The 8th-century Buddhist temple houses three large stone statues of Vairocana, Avalokiteshvara, and Vajrapani.
- Pawon: The small 8th-century Buddhist temple near the bank of Progo River is located between Mendut and Borobudur.
- Ngawen: The 8th-century Buddhist temple is located about 5 kilometers east of Mendut temple.
- Banon: The ruins of a Hindu temple; located several hundred meters north of Pawon temple. However, no significant remains of the temple have survived, thus, its reconstruction is impossible. Only the statues of Shiva, Vishnu, Agastya, and Ganesha have been discovered, which are now displayed at the National Museum of Indonesia, Jakarta.
- Canggal: also known as Candi Gunung Wukir. One of the oldest Hindu temples in the area. The temple is located in the Muntilan area, near the temple a Canggal inscription connected with Sri Sanjaya, the king of Mataram kingdom was discovered.
- Gunung Sari: The ruins of a Hindu temple on top of a hill, located near Candi Gunung Wukir, on the outskirts of Muntilan.
- Umbul: in Grabag, Magelang; it served as a bathing and resting place for the kings of Mataram.

== See also ==
- Hinduism in Java
- Indonesian Esoteric Buddhism
- Kewu Plain
- Tri Tepusan inscription (842)
