= Kalasan inscription =

Inscription from Central Java, Indonesia

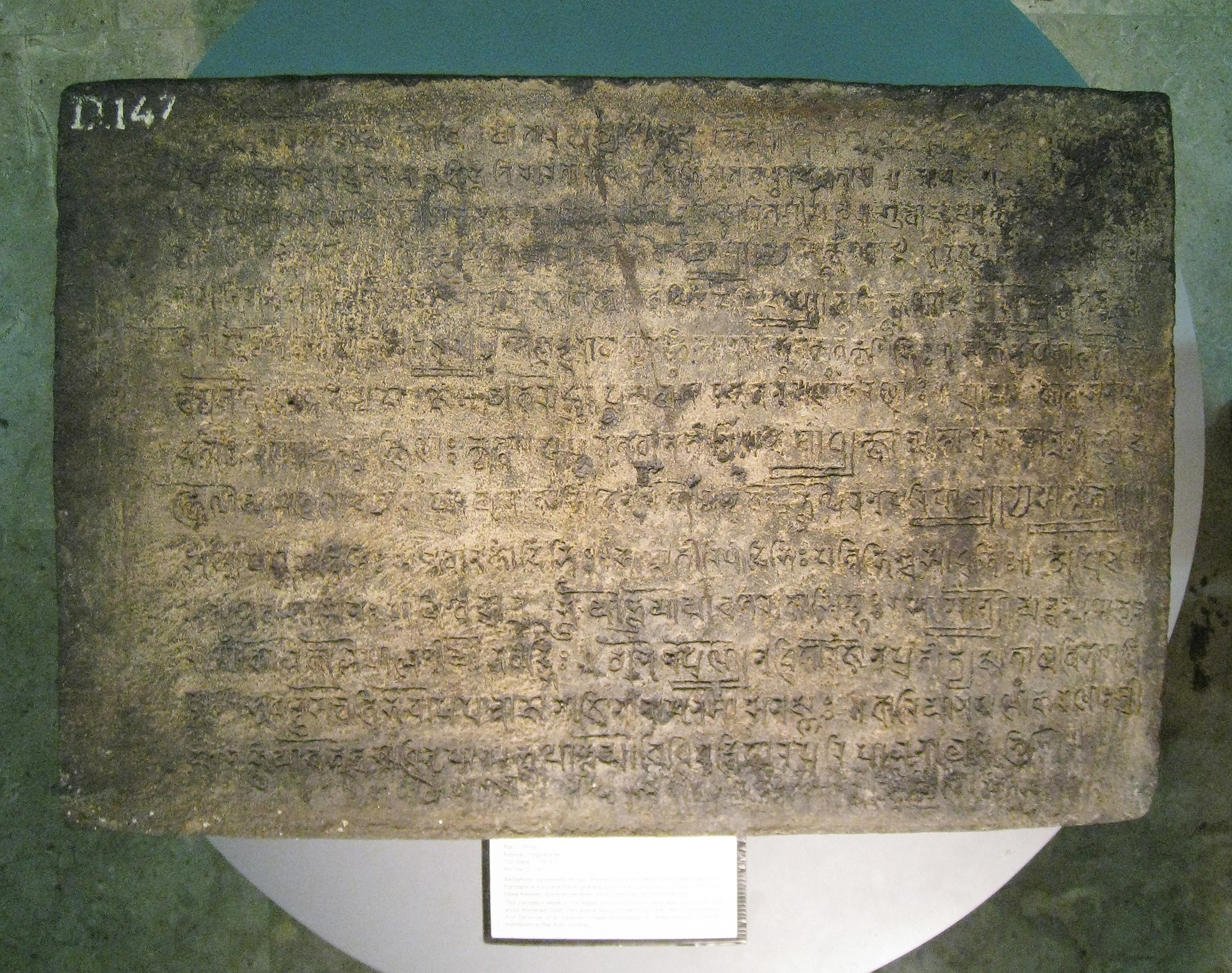
- Kalasan inscription, displayed at National Museum of Indonesia, Jakarta
- Material: Andesite stone
- Writing: Pranagari script in Sanskrit
- Created: 700 Saka (778 CE)
- Discovered: Kalasan village, Sleman Regency, Yogyakarta, Indonesia
- Present location: National Museum of Indonesia, Jakarta
- Registration: D.147

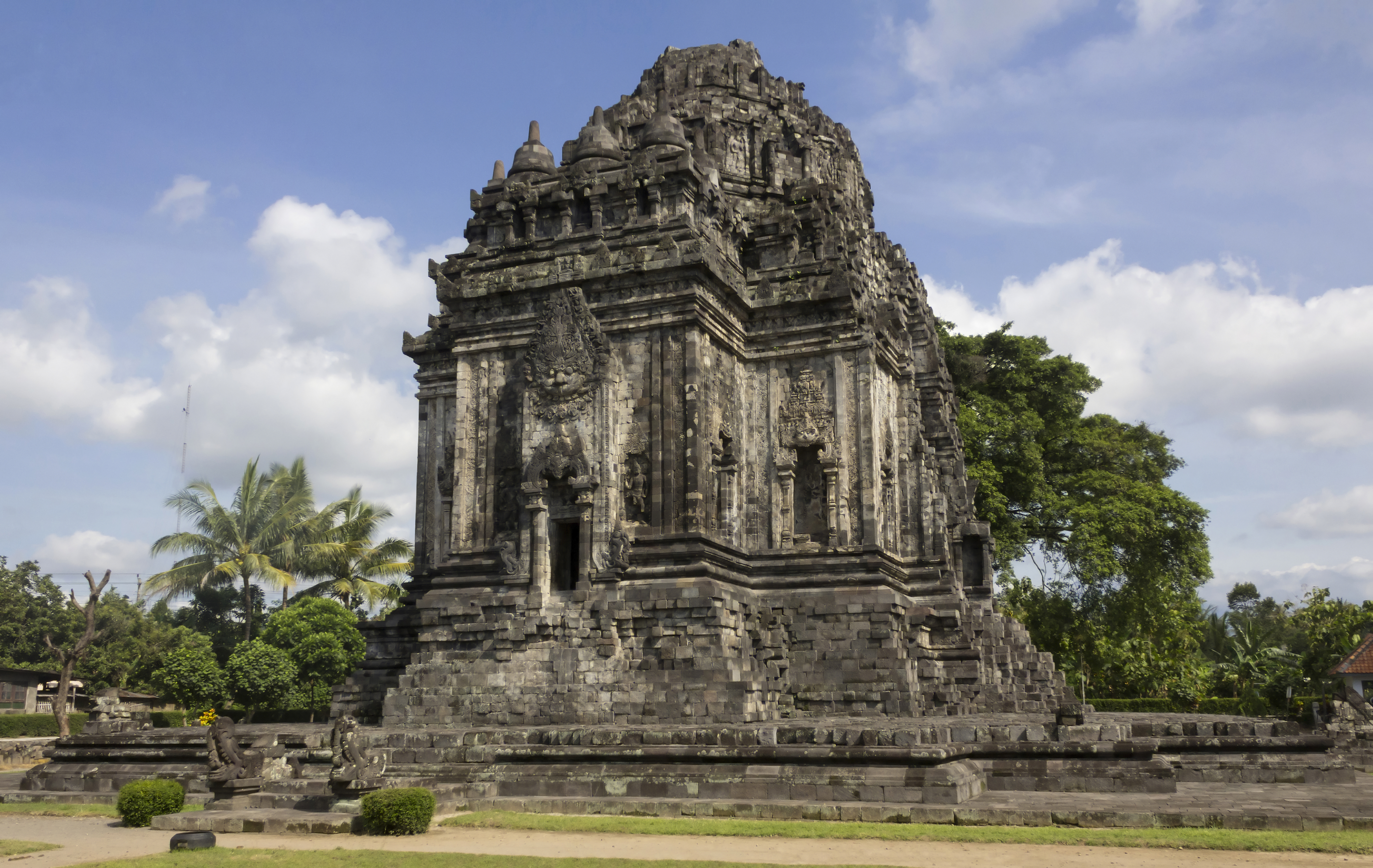
The Kalasan inscription is linked with the construction of Kalasan temple

The Kalasan inscription is an inscription dated 700 Saka (778 CE), discovered in Kalasan village, Sleman Regency, Yogyakarta, Indonesia. The inscription was written in Sanskrit with Pranagari script (Northern India). This is the first inscription discovered in Indonesia that mentioned the dynastic name of Sailendra as Sailendravamça.

== Contents ==
The inscription mentioned Guru Sang Raja Sailendravamçatilaka (Teacher of the King, the Jewel of the Sailendra family) who succeeded in persuading Maharaja Tejapurnapana Panangkaran (in other part of the inscription also called Kariyana Panangkaran) to construct a holy building for (Bodhisattvadevi) Tara and also build a Vihara (monastery) for Buddhist monks from Sailendra family's realm. Panangkaran donated the Kalaça village to Sangha (Buddhist monastic community). The temple dedicated to Tara is identified as Kalasan temple.

The inscription now is displayed in the National Museum of Indonesia, Jakarta, under inventory number No. D.147.

=== Transcription ===
Namo bhagavatyai āryātārāyai

1. yā tārayatyamitaduḥkhabhavādbhimagnaṃ lokaṃ vilokya vidhivattrividhair upayaiḥ Sā vaḥ surendranaralokavibhūtisāraṃ tārā diśatvabhimataṃ jagadekatārā

2. āvarjya mahārājaṃ dyāḥ pañcapaṇaṃ paṇaṃkaraṇāṃ Śailendra rājagurubhis tārābhavanaṃ hi kāritaṃ śrīmat

3. gurvājñayā kŗtajñais tārādevī kŗtāpi tad bhavanaṃ vinayamahāyānavidāṃ bhavanaṃ cāpyāryabhikṣūṇāṃ

4. pangkuratavānatīripanāmabhir ādeśaśastribhīrājñaḥ Tārābhavanaṃ kāritamidaṃ mapi cāpy āryabhiksūṇam

5. rājye pravarddhamāne rājñāḥ śailendravamśatilakasya śailendrarajagurubhis tārābhavanaṃ kŗtaṃ kŗtibhiḥ

6. śakanŗpakālātītair varṣaśataiḥ saptabhir mahārājaḥ akarod gurupūjārthaṃ tārābhavanaṃ paṇamkaraṇaḥ

7. grāmaḥ kālasanāmā dattaḥ saṃghāyā sākṣiṇaḥ kŗtvā pankuratavānatiripa desādhyakṣān mahāpuruṣān

8. bhuradakṣineyam atulā dattā saṃghāyā rājasiṃhena śailendrarajabhūpair anuparipālyārsantatyā

9. sang pangkurādibhih sang tāvānakādibhiḥ sang tīripādibhiḥ pattibhiśca sādubhiḥ, api ca,

10. sarvān evāgāminaḥ pārthivendrān bhūyo bhūyo yācate rājasiṃhaḥ, sāmānyoyaṃ dharmmasetur narānāṃ kāle kāle pālanīyo bhavadbhiḥ

11. anena puṇyena vīhārajena pratītya jāta arthavibhāgavijñāḥ bhavantu sarve tribhavopapannā janājinānām anuśsanajñāḥ

12. kariyānapaṇaṃkaraṇaḥ śrimān abhiyācate bhāvinŗpān, bhūyo bhūyo vidhivad vīhāraparipālan ārtham iti.

=== Translation into English ===
Honor for Bhagavatī Ārya Tārā

1. After seeing all the creatures in the world drowned in misery, he take across (with) three true knowledges, she Tarā who became the only guiding star for direction in the world and (the realm of) the gods .

2. A holy building for the Tārā that is truly beautiful was ordered by the teachers of Sailendra king, after obtaining the approval of the Maharaja Dyah Pancapana Panamkarana

3. By order of the teacher, a sacred building (dedicated) to Tārā has been established, and likewise a building for the noble (Buddhist) monks skilled in the Mahāyana teachings, has been established by experts

4. Tārā's sacred building as well as the (building) belongs to the noble monks had been established by the officials commissioned by the king, called Pangkura, Tavana, Tiripa.

5. A sacred building for Tārā has been established by the teachers of Śailendra king in a growing kingdom the jewel (ornament) of Śailendra dynasty

6. Mahārāja Panangkarana constructed a Tārā sacred building to honor his teachers that have run for 700 years.

7. The Kalasa village has been given to Samgha after calling the witnesses; prominent people the village authorities which are Pangkura, Tavana, Tiripa.

8. The alms of “bhura” that is incomparable given to the Sangha by the "king like a lion" (rājasimha-) by the kings of the Śailendra dynasty and subsequent rulers.

9. By the Pangkura and his followers, the Tavana and his followers, the Tiripa and his followers, by the soldiers, and religious leaders, then the next,

10. "The king that is like a lion" (rājasimhah) asked repeatedly to the upcoming kings to be bound to Dharma so that they will be protected forever.

11. Well, by granting the vihara (monastery), all sacred knowledge, the Law of Cause and Effect, and births in the three worlds (as appropriate with) Buddhism, can be understood.

12. Kariyana Panangkarana asked repeatedly to upcoming noble kings to always protect this important temple according to the rules.

== See also ==
- Canggal inscription (732)
- Kelurak inscription (782)
- Karangtengah inscription (824)
- Mantyasih inscription (907)
- Laguna Copperplate Inscription (900)
- Sojomerto inscription (725)
- Tri Tepusan inscription (842)
- Buddhism in Indonesia
- Candi of Indonesia
- Indonesian Esoteric Buddhism
- Kedu Plain
