= Canggal inscription =

Sanskrit inscription from Java, Indonesia

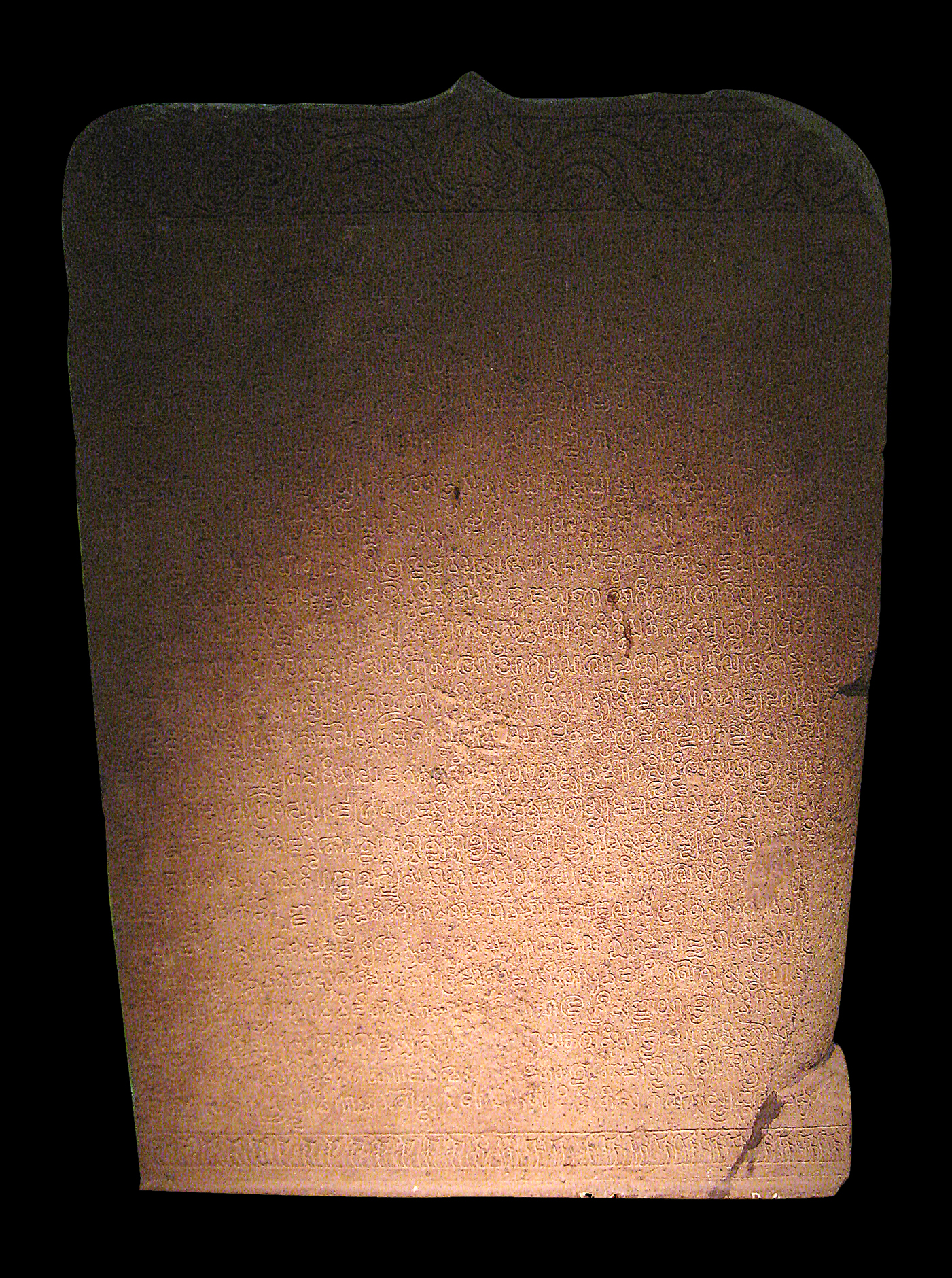
- Canggal inscription, displayed at National Museum of Indonesia, Jakarta
- Material: Andesite stone
- Writing: Pallava script in Sanskrit
- Created: 732 CE
- Discovered: Gunung Wukir temple complex in Kadiluwih village, Salam, Magelang Regency, Central Java, Indonesia
- Present location: National Museum of Indonesia, Jakarta

The Canggal inscription is a Sanskrit inscription dated to 732, discovered in the Gunung Wukir temple complex in Kadiluwih village, Salam, Magelang Regency, Central Java, Indonesia. The inscription is written in the Pallava alphabet. The inscription documents an edict of Sanjaya, in which he declared himself the universal ruler of the Mataram kingdom.

== Content ==
The inscription describes the erection of a lingam (the symbol of Shiva) in the country of Kunjarakunja, by Sanjaya's order. The lingam is sited on the noble island of Yava (Java), which the inscription describes as "rich in grain and gold mines". Yawadwipa ("Java island"), and had long been under the rule of the wise and virtuous king Sanna, but fell into disunity after his death. Amid a period of confusion Sanjaya, son of Sannaha (the sister of Sanna) ascended to the throne. Sanjaya mastered holy scriptures, and martial arts, and displayed military prowess. After the conquest of neighboring areas, his reign was peaceful and prosperous.

The inscription refers to Kunjarakunja-desa, perhaps meaning "the hermitage land of Kunjara", which has been identified as the hermitage of Rishi Agastya, a Hindu Maharishi revered in Southern India. The Ramayana contains a reference to a visit to Agastya hermitage on Kunjara by Rama, Sita, and Lakshmana.

The name Sanjaya, Sanna and Sannaha curiously was also mentioned in Carita Parahyangan, a book from a later period composed around 16th century which suggested refer to the same historical person.

== See also ==
- Sojomerto inscription (c. 725)
- Kalasan inscription (778)
- Kelurak inscription (782)
- Karangtengah inscription (824)
- Mantyasih inscription (907)
- Laguna Copperplate Inscription (900)
- Tri Tepusan inscription (842)
- Shivagrha inscription (856)
- Hinduism in Indonesia
- Hinduism in Java
- Pararaton (Book of Kings)
- Indonesian Esoteric Buddhism
- Kedu Plain
