= Balitung =

- Rakai Watukura

Great King of Mataram
- Reign: 10 May 898 – c. 910
- Predecessor: Jebang
- Successor: Daksha
- Born: Balitung
Regnal name
- Śrī Dharmodaya Mahāśambhu (frequent) Śrī Īsvarakeśavotsvatuṅga (frequent); Śrī Bāhuvikramabajradeva (Tiga Ron) Sang Janārdanottuṅga (Rumwiga I)
- Religion: Shaivism

Balitung was a Javanese king of Mataram. Balitung was his birth name, though like other Javanese kings of this period, he was commonly referred to by his appanage title Rakai Watukura (Lord of Watukura). He reigned from 10 May 898 to c. 911–912. His territories included a wide range of areas in Central Java and East Java.

Over 40 inscriptions were issued during Balitung's reign, making this period one of the best documented in early Javanese history. Only around half of these inscriptions were issued under the king's direct authority; others were produced by his ministers, or even by local communities. Among his best-known inscriptions the Mantyasih inscription (907) and the Wanua Tengah III inscription (908), both of which contain lists of Mataram kings.

== Regnal names ==
Balitung had an unusually diverse range of regnal names, which are in Sanskrit as usual for early Javanese kings. He most commonly appears in inscriptions as Śrī Dharmodaya Mahāśambhu ('glorious, creator of dharma, greatly beneficent'); this title appears as early as the Ayam Teas inscription (901) and as late as the problematic Tulangan inscription (910). His second most frequent regnal name is Śrī Īsvarakeśavotsavatuṅga ('glorious, Īśvara and Keśava [a.k.a. Śiva and Viṣṇu], highest in joy') or Śrī Īsvarakeśavasamarotuṅga ('glorious, highest in the union of Īśvara and Keśava'), which is found first in the Watu Kura I inscription (902) and finally in the Watu Ridang inscription (910). Two regnal names appear only in single inscriptions. In the Tiga Ron inscription (900), Balitung is referred to as Śrī Bāhuvikramabajradeva ('glorious, god of thunder, having powerful forearms'), which shares significant elements with Daksha's standard title Śrī Bāhubajrapratipakṣakṣaya. In the Rumwiga I inscription (904), Balitung is called Janārdanottuṅga ('highest agitator of people', an epithet of Viṣṇu). Balitung's motivation for using different names in different contexts is unclear.

== Origins ==
Balitung's origins have been much debated. Goris (1929) suggested that Balitung originated from East Java, though other historians such as Boechari (1977) have doubted this. Balitung's family relationships to preceding kings is not explained in any inscriptions, and so is a matter of pure speculation for historians. Boechari hypothesised that Balitung became king due his marriage to the daughter of his predecessor Jebang (Lord of Watuhumalang), who ruled immediately before him, and furthermore that Balitung's successor Daksha was his brother-in-law.

== Reign ==
According to the Wanua Tengah III inscription, Balitung came to power on 10 May 898. This inscription also mentions the role of Dakṣa as his prime minister (mahāmantri); Balitung is described as an 'incarnation of Rudra (a.k.a Śiva)', while Dakṣa is described as an 'incarnation of Viṣṇu'. In the Kubu-Kubu inscription (905), Daksha is referred to as the king's companion (rowang haji), a very rare status that may indicate some degree of parity. This dualism reflects the exceptionally powerful position of Dakṣa throughout Balitung's reign, though the reason for his prominence is not well understood.

The oldest known inscription issued in Balitung's reign is the stele of Telahap (issued on 11 March 899). However, this inscription has only been read in part and is no longer extant; it therefore sheds little light on Balitung's reign.

On 30 March 900, Balitung ordered the completion of waterworks and the irrigation of rice fields at the sanctuary of Tiga Ron ('Three Leaves'), which can be identified with present-day Kedulan temple. An extensive narrative passage in the opening to the Tiga Ron inscription describes how Balitung noticed the poor condition of the temple and its fountain while he was trapping pigeons in the area. Having sought information on the matter from Śivāstra, the official (sang pamegat) of Tiruan, he learned that the original construction dated back to the reign of Lokapala, but it had never been properly completed. In 869, a noblewoman called Manoharī had made provisions for the same dam, as shown in the Pananggaran and Sumundul inscriptions also discovered at the Kedulan site; this project remained unfinished after three decades. Balitung therefore ordered the waterworks be properly completed, to ensure that rice fields belonging to the lord of the sanctuary were sufficiently irrigated. This episode demonstrates Balitung's concern for the upkeep of holy sanctuaries and the importance of agrarian water management, as well as the infrastructural challenges faced by ancient Javanese society.

The oldest of Balitung's east Javanese inscriptions is Watukura (27 July 902), which exists only in a Majapahit-era copy. This is the oldest inscription that mentions the existence of the title lord of Kanuruhan, which may be connected to the toponym Kanjuruhan in the Malang area.

The Telang plates (11 January 904) mention the development of a complex named Paparahuan, led by Rakai Welar Mpu Sudarsana, located on the verge of the Bengawan Solo river. Balitung freed the villages in Paparahuan and its surroundings from tax, and forbade the local inhabitants to collect payment from people who crossed the river.

On 12 November 904, Balitung made the far-reaching decision that "all Buddhist monasteries (vihāra) in Java be independent and cease to be taxed". This demonstrates the king's support of Buddhist institutions, despite indications that he was personally oriented towards Śaivism. This decision may have formed the legal basis for Balitung's earlier grant to the foundation of Dalinan (5 March 904), as well as later grants to the monasteries of Hujung Galuh (4 May 907) and Pikatan (8 September 908).

The Poh inscription (17 July 905) states that the village of Poh was freed from tax in return for taking care of the holy caitya which served as a funerary monument for 'the deity who lies at Pastika' (bhaṭāra lumah iṅ Pastika). The identity of this deceased figure is unclear, though it is known from the Wintang Mas II inscription that he was a former king (śrī mahārāja). A notable figure involved in the issuing of the Poh inscription was Balitung's grandmother Tammer; in the list of attendees she precedes Daksha and is second only to the king himself.

The Kubu-Kubu inscription (17 October 905) describes a grant given by Balitung to the lords (rakryān) of Hujung and of Majawuntan in form of a village, Kubu-Kubu, as they both conquered the Bantan area under the instructions of Daksha. Damais (1952) suggested that Bantan might be an alternative form of the name Bali, though this interpretation was questioned by Boechari (1976).

The charter of Mantyasih (11 April 907) describes a grant to five junior patihs because they kept the peace during Balitung's wedding. This inscription gives a selective list of deified former kings of Mataram, who are ritually invoked during the demarcation ceremony as witnesses and guarantors. These kings are addressed as "ye ancestors of old at Medang [and] at Poh Pitu" (kamu, ra hyaṅta rumuhun ri mḍaṅ, ri poḥ pitu). While the grammar of this phrase is somewhat ambiguous, a likely explanation is that Medang and Poh Pitu refer to two separate locations where the pre-Balitung kings had their palaces (cf. the mentions of Medang in connection with Mamrati in the Shivagrha inscription).

On 19 October 907, Balitung granted the village of Rukam to his grandmother, the lady of Sanjiwana, as compensation for property she had lost due to a volcanic eruption (guntur).

== The end of an era ==
The accession of Balitung as king may have caused the previous king's son, Mpu Daksha, to become jealous. During the rule of his brother-in-law, Mpu Daksha held the position of Rakai Hino as described in a stele dated 21 December 910 about the partition of the Taji Gunung area between him and Rakai Gurunwangi. According to the stele of Plaosan, Rakai Gurunwangi is rumoured to be the son of Rakai Pikatan.

Historians speculate that Rakai Gurunwangi allied himself with Mpu Daksha, his nephew, as they are the son and grandson of Rakai Pikatan.

The historian Boechari is certain that the rule of Balitung ended as a result of Mpu Daksa's rebellion. According to the stele of Taji Gunung (910), Daksha was still as Rakai Hino, while by the stele of Timbangan Wungkal (913), he had already ascended the throne as king.

== See also ==
- Kingdom of Mataram
- History of Indonesia
