= Karangtengah inscription =

Inscription from Central Java, Indonesia

Karangtengah inscription (also known as Kayumwungan inscription) is the inscription written on five pieces of stones dated 746 Saka or 824 CE, discovered in Karangtengah hamlet, Temanggung Regency, Central Java, Indonesia. The inscription was written in ancient Javanese script in two languages; Old Javanese and Sanskrit. Lines 1-24 were written in Sanskrit, and the rest of the lines were written in old Javanese. The inscription is linked with the temples Borobudur and Mendut.

== Contents ==
The parts written in Sanskrit mentioned a king named Samaratungga. His daughter Pramodhawardhani inaugurated a Jinalaya (Sanskrit meaning: Jain temple and the realm of those who have conquered worldly desire and reached enlightenment called jina which is also a common epithet of the Buddha which is most likely the intended meaning here ), a sacred Jina sanctuary. The inscription also mentioned a sacred Buddhist building called Venuvana (Sankirt: bamboo forest) to place the cremated ashes of the 'king of the cloud', the name for the god Indra, probably referred to as King Indra of the Sailendra dynasty. Jinalaya was identified as Borobudur. Venuvana was identified as Mendut temple by Dutch archaeologist JG de Casparis, while Soekmono identified it with Ngawen temple instead.

The parts written in old Javanese mentioned an event, that on the 10th day of Kresnapaksa in the month of Jyestha year 746 Saka (824 CE), Rakai Patapan pu Palar inaugurated that rice fields in Kayumwungan to be the tax-free land protected by royal edict. Rakai Patapan pu Palar is identified as Rakai Garung, the king of Mataram kingdom. Indonesian historian Slamet Muljana suggests Rakai Garung was another name of Samaratungga.

== See also ==
- Canggal inscription (732)
- Kalasan inscription (778)
- Kelurak inscription (782)
- Mantyasih inscription (907)
- Laguna Copperplate Inscription (900)
- Shivagrha inscription (856)
- Tri Tepusan inscription (842)
- Buddhism in Indonesia
- Candi of Indonesia
- Hinduism in Java
- Indonesian Esoteric Buddhism
