= Pramodhawardhani =

- Çrī Kahulunnan; Çrī Sanjiwana

Queen Consort of Mataram
- Reign: c. 847 – 856
- Spouse: Rakai Pikatan Dyah Saladu
- Issue: Rakai Kayuwangi Dyah Lokapala
- House: Shailendra
- Father: King Samaratungga
- Religion: Mahayana Buddhism

Pramodhawardhani (also identified as Çrī Kahulunnan or Çrī Sanjiwana) was the queen consort of King Rakai Pikatan (r. 838–850) of Mataram kingdom in 9th century Central Java. She was the daughter of Sailendran king Samaratungga (r. 812–833). Her royal marriage to the Prince of Pikatan (of the Hindu Śaivite Sanjaya dynasty) was not explicitly stated in any single inscription. However, it is interpreted based on a combination of sources, one of the most significant being the short inscriptions found at the north Plaosan temple, published and analyzed by J.G. de Casparis in Short Inscriptions from Tjandi Plaosan-Lor (1958).

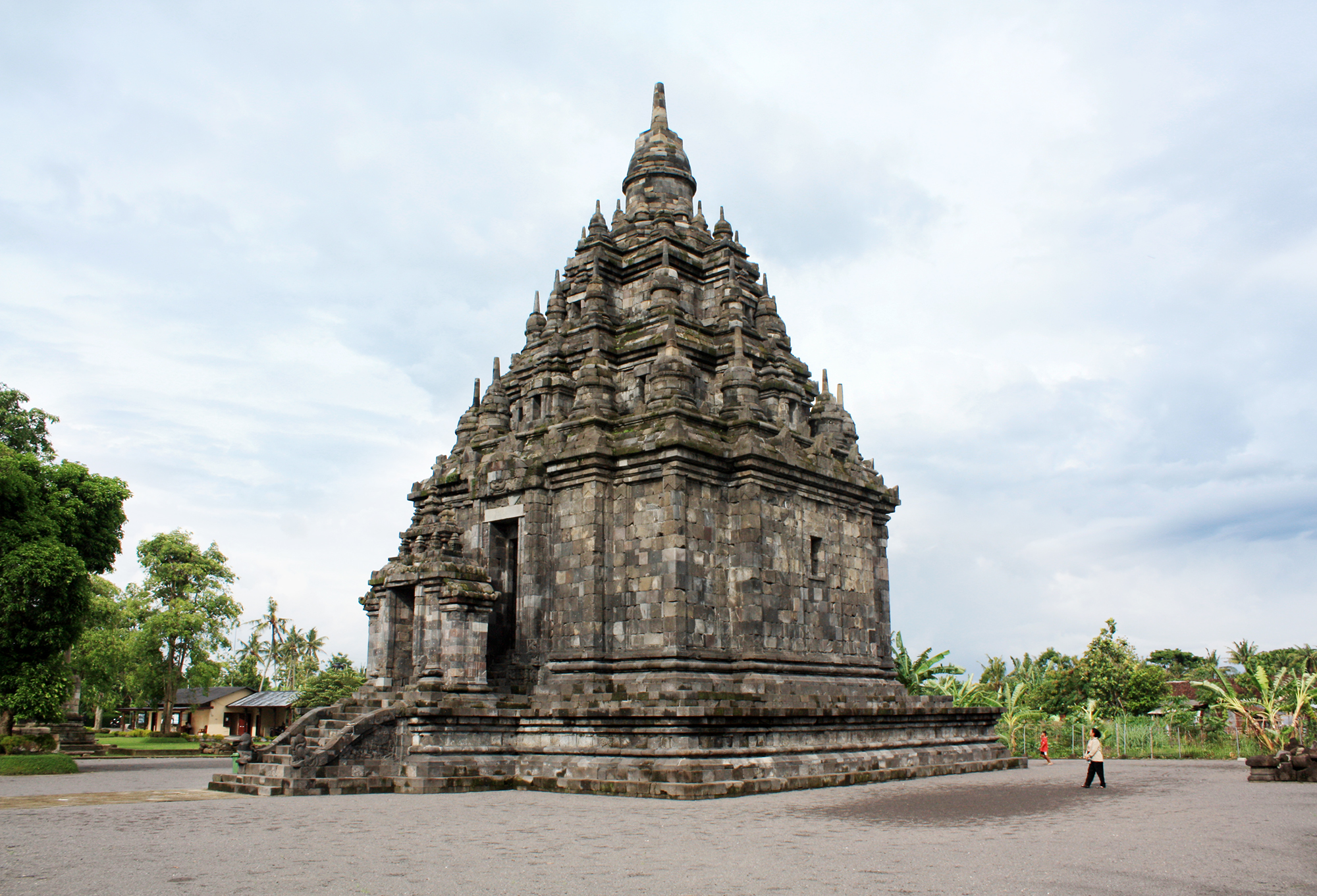
Sojiwan Buddhist temple, dedicated for the queen mother Sanjiwana, which identified as Pramodhawardhani.

She was credited for the inauguration of Borobudur and the construction of several Buddhist temples in Prambanan Plain; among others the small pervara temples in Sewu compound, Plaosan, and Sojiwan Buddhist temples. Her name was mentioned in several inscriptions, such as the Karangtengah inscription, Tri Tepusan inscription, and Rukam inscription. Tri Tepusan inscription dated 842 mentioned about the sima (tax-free) lands awarded by Çrī Kahulunnan to ensure the funding and maintenance of a Kamūlān called Bhūmisambhāra (Borobudur), while the Rukam inscription dated 829 Saka (907 CE) mentioned about the inauguration of Rukam village restoration by Nini Haji Rakryan Sanjiwana, previously the village was being devastated by a volcanic eruption, and the obligation of Rukam village inhabitants to take care of a sacred building located in Limwung. This sacred building was identified as the Sajiwan temple.

According to the interpretation of Roro Jonggrang legend, Pramodhawardhani's likeness was the model for Durga's image in the Prambanan temple.
