= Kelurak inscription =

Sanskrit inscription from Central Java, Indonesia

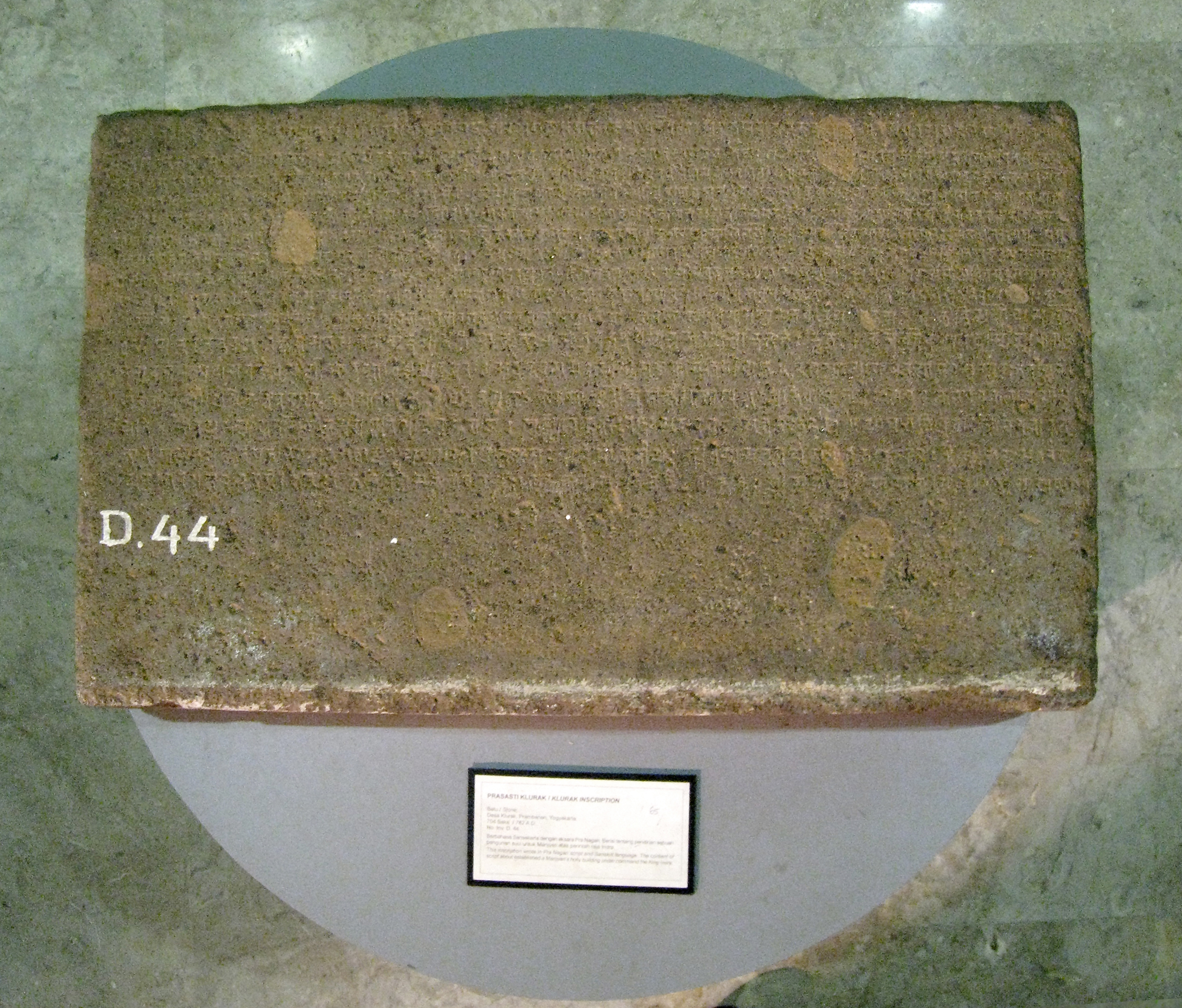
- Kelurak inscription, displayed at National Museum of Indonesia, Jakarta
- Material: Andesite stone
- Writing: Pranagari script in Sanskrit
- Created: 704 Saka (782 CE)
- Discovered: Lumbung temple in Kelurak village, Klaten Regency, located not far north of Prambanan temple, Central Java, Indonesia
- Present location: National Museum of Indonesia, Jakarta
- Registration: D.44

The Kelurak inscription is an inscription dated 704 Saka (782 CE), written in Sanskrit with Pranagari script, discovered near Lumbung temple in Kelurak village, Central Java, Indonesia. Lumbung temple is a bit north of Prambanan temple in Yogyakarta.

The writings on the inscription were discovered in poor condition with several parts being unclear and unreadable, as a result, historians could only translate the main information of the inscription.

== Contents ==
The inscription mentioned the construction of a sacred Buddhist building to house the Manjusri statue that contains the wisdom of Buddha, Dharma, and Sangha; the same trinity as Brahma, Vishnu, and Maheshvara. The construction of this sacred building was ordered by King Indra, revered by his official name Sri Sanggramadhananjaya. The reference to Hindu gods in this Buddhist temple signifies the Tantrayana—Vajrayana Buddhism influence. The temple dedicated to Manjusri is identified as Sewu temple, located not far north from Prambanan temple.

Today the inscription is displayed in the National Museum of Indonesia, Jakarta, under the inventory number No. D.44.

== See also ==
- Canggal inscription (732)
- Kalasan inscription (778)
- Karangtengah inscription (824)
- Manjusrigrha inscription (792)
- Laguna Copperplate Inscription (900)
- Shivagrha inscription (856)
- Tri Tepusan inscription (842)
- Buddhism in Indonesia
- Candi of Indonesia
- Indonesian Esoteric Buddhism
