= Borobudur =

9th-century Buddhist temple in Java, Indonesia

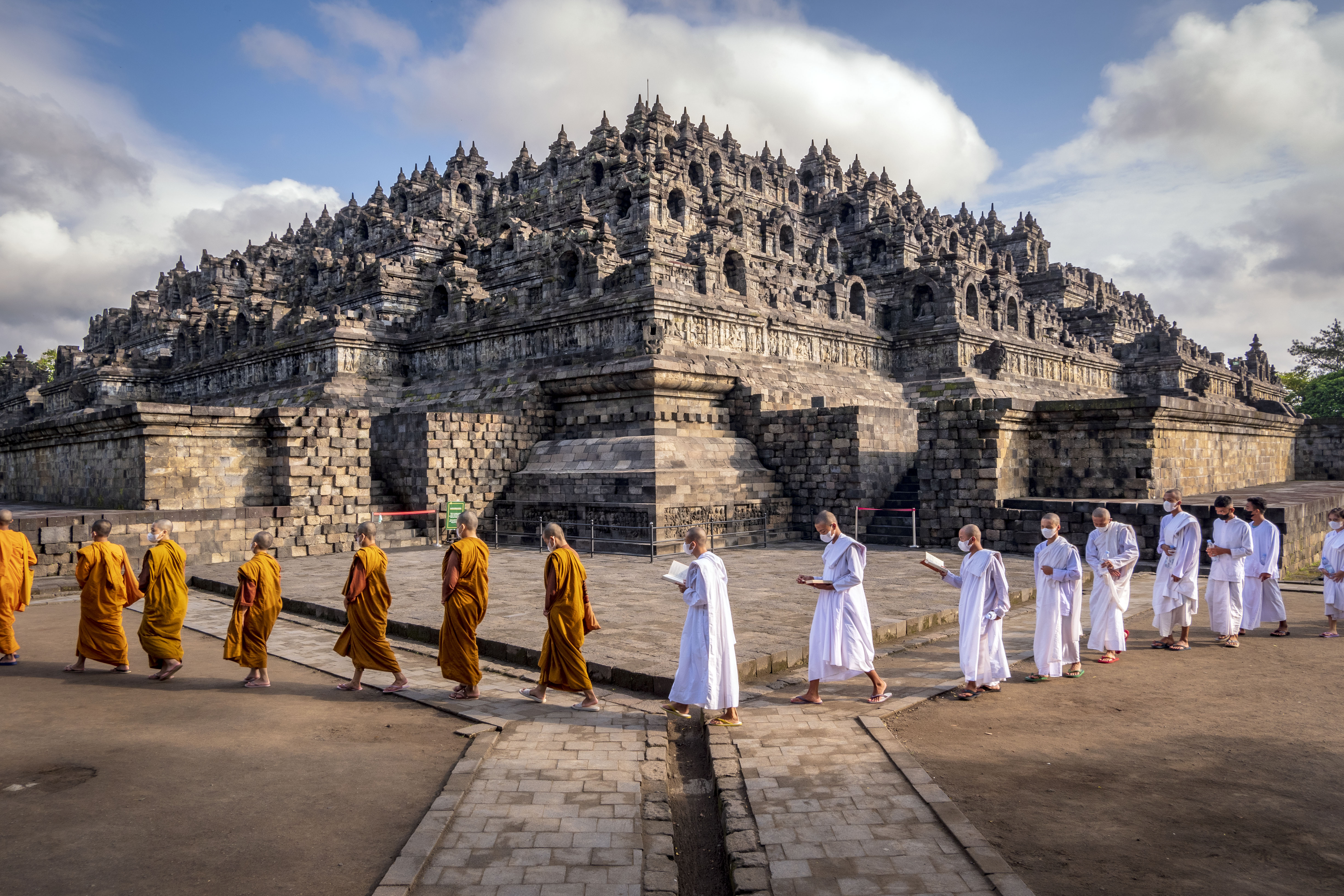
- Monks following Pradakshina at Borobudur

- Location within Java Borobudur (Indonesia)
- 7.608°S 110.204°E
- Location: Magelang Regency, Central Java, Indonesia

History
- Built: Originally built in the 9th century during the reign of the Sailendra Dynasty

Site notes
- Architect: Gunadharma
- Restored: 1911, 1983
- Restored by: Theodoor van Erp
- Website: borobudurpark.com, kebudayaan.kemdikbud.go.id/bkborobudur

UNESCO World Heritage Site
- Type: Cultural
- Criteria: i, ii, vi
- Designated: 1991 (15th session)
- Part of: Borobudur Temple Compounds
- Reference no.: 592
- Region: Southeast Asia

Borobudur, also transcribed Barabudur (Indonesian: Candi Borobudur, Javanese: ꦕꦤ꧀ꦝꦶꦧꦫꦧꦸꦝꦸꦂ, romanized: Candhi Barabudhur), is a 9th-century Mahayana Buddhist temple in Magelang Regency, near the town of Muntilan, northwest of the city of Yogyakarta, in Central Java, Indonesia.

Constructed of gray andesite-like stone, the temple consists of nine stacked platforms, six square and three circular, topped by a central dome. It is decorated with 2,672 relief panels and originally 504 Buddha statues. The central dome is surrounded by 72 Buddha statues, each seated inside a perforated stupa. The monument guides pilgrims through an extensive system of stairways and corridors with 1,460 narrative relief panels on the walls and the balustrades. Borobudur has one of the world's most extensive collections of Buddhist reliefs.

Built during the reign of the Sailendra dynasty, the temple design follows Javanese Buddhist architecture, which blends the Indonesian indigenous tradition of ancestor worship and the Buddhist concept of attaining nirvāṇa. The monument is a shrine to the Buddha and a place for Buddhist pilgrimage. Evidence suggests that Borobudur was constructed in the 8th century and subsequently abandoned following the 14th-century decline of Hindu kingdoms in Java and the Javanese conversion to Islam. Worldwide knowledge of its existence was sparked in 1814 by Thomas Stamford Raffles, then the British administrator of Java, who was advised of its location by native Indonesians. Borobudur has since been preserved through several restorations. The largest restoration project was completed in 1983 by the Indonesian government and UNESCO, followed by the monument's listing as a UNESCO World Heritage Site.

Borobudur is the largest Buddhist temple in the world, and ranks with Bagan in Myanmar and Angkor Wat in Cambodia as one of the great archeological sites of Southeast Asia. Borobudur remains popular for pilgrimage, with Buddhists in Indonesia celebrating Vesak Day at the monument. Among Indonesia's tourist attractions, Borobudur is the most-visited monument.

== Etymology ==
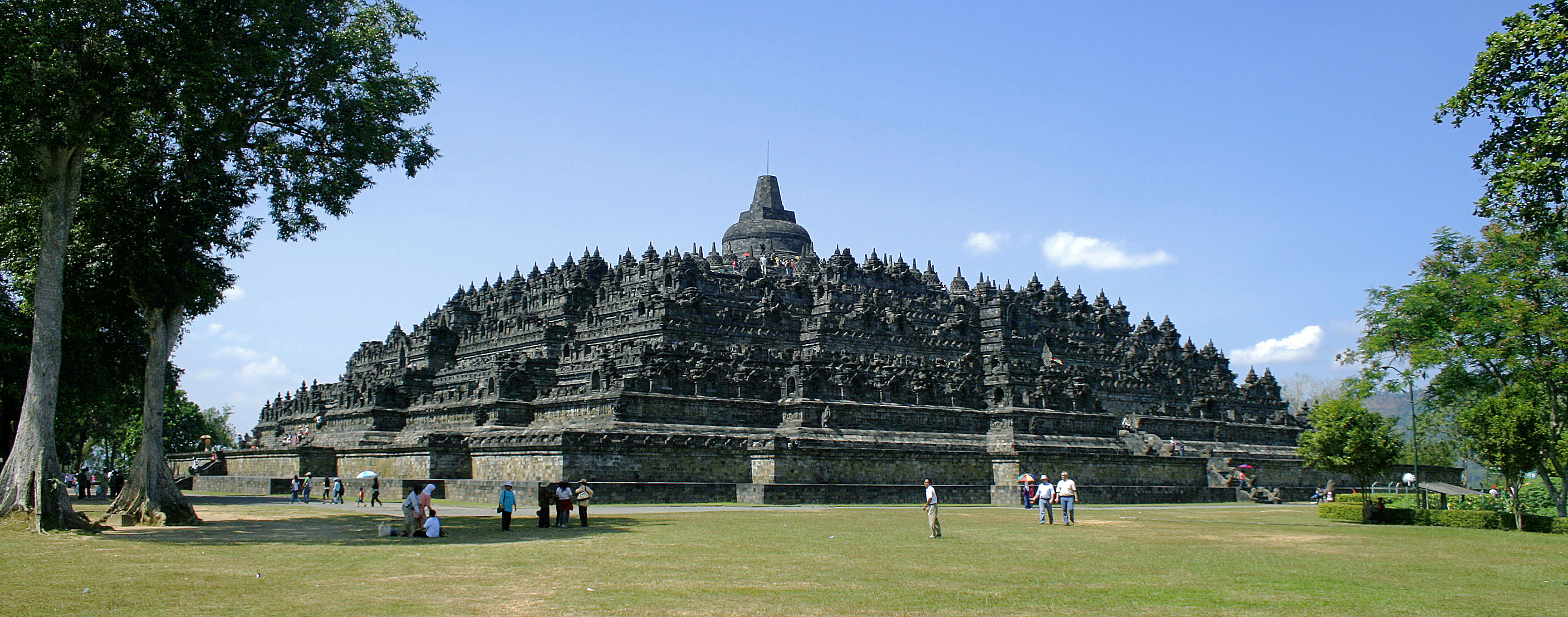
Candi Borobudur viewed from the northwest. The monument was mentioned in the Karangtengah and Tri Tepusan inscriptions.

In Indonesian, ancient temples are referred to as candi; thus locals refer to "Borobudur Temple" as Candi Borobudur. The term candi also loosely describes ancient structures, for example, gates and baths. Dutch scholar J. L. Moens says the court poet Mpu Prapanca referred to a holy sanctuary at "Budur" in 1365.

Stamford Raffles mentioned "Bóro Bódo" and described the temple in his 1817 work, The History of Java. In a footnote, Raffles says, "Bóro is the name of the district, and bódo means ancient."

Most candi are named after a nearby village. If it was to follow Javanese language conventions and was named after the nearby village of Bore, the monument should have been named "BudurBoro". Soekmono says Raffles thought that Budur might correspond to the modern Javanese word Buda ("ancient")—i.e., "ancient Boro". However, another archaeologist suggests the second component of the name (Budur) comes from Javanese term bhudhara ("mountain").

Another possible etymology by Dutch archaeologist A. J. Bernet Kempers suggests that Borobudur is a corrupted simplified local Javanese pronunciation of Biara Beduhur written in Sanskrit as Vihara Buddha Uhr. The term Buddha-Uhr could mean "the city of Buddhas", while another possible term Beduhur is probably an Old Javanese term, still surviving today in Balinese vocabulary, which means "a high place", constructed from the stem word dhuhur or luhur (high). This suggests that Borobudur means vihara of Buddha located on a high place or on a hill.

The construction and inauguration of a sacred Buddhist building—possibly a reference to Borobudur—was mentioned in two inscriptions, both discovered in Kedu, Temanggung Regency. The Karangtengah inscription, dated 824, mentioned a sacred building named Jinalaya (the realm of those who have conquered worldly desire and reached enlightenment), inaugurated by Pramodhawardhani, daughter of Samaratungga. The Tri Tepusan inscription, dated 842, is mentioned in the sima, the (tax-free) lands awarded by Çrī Kahulunnan (Pramodhawardhani) to ensure the funding and maintenance of a Kamūlān called Bhūmisambhāra. Kamūlān is from the word mula, which means "the place of origin", a sacred building to honor the ancestors, probably those of the Sailendras. Johannes Gijsbertus de Casparis suggested that Bhūmi Sambhāra Bhudhāra, Sanskrit for a mountain of combined virtues after the ten stages of Boddhisattvahood, was the original name of Borobudur.

In 2018, Titi Surti Nastiti, a researcher from the National Research and Innovation Agency, proposed that the name Borobudur originates from boro, meaning "monastery" as suggested by Poerbatjaraka, and budur, which comes from a type of palm tree that served as the namesake for the village of Budur mentioned by Raffles and the Nagarakretagama.

== Location ==
=== The three temples ===
Straight-line arrangement of Borobudur, Pawon, and Mendut

Borubudur is located approximately 40 kilometres (25 mi) northwest of Yogyakarta and 86 kilometres (53 mi) west of Surakarta. It is also located in an elevated area between twin volcanoes, Sindoro-Sumbing and Merbabu-Merapi, and two rivers, the Progo and the Elo. According to local myth, the area known as Kedu Plain is a Javanese "sacred" place and has been dubbed "the garden of Java" due to its high agricultural fertility.

During the restoration in the early 20th century, Theodoor van Erp discovered that three Buddhist temples in the region, Borobudur, Pawon and Mendut, are positioned along a straight line from east to west.

Jan Lodewijk Moens hypothesized a ritual connecting the three temples. However, the exact process remains unknown due to a lack of written records about the ritual. He hypothesized that the ritual was done by doing pilgrimage following the sun path where it starting with Borobudur as the sunset following with Pawon as the zenith and ending with Mendut as the sunrise. Giulio Magli also identified that the ritual is following the event of the zennith passage that happening on October 11 and February 28. He also compared Borubudur with One Hundred and Eight Stupas where the building itself is built around ritual related to the winter solstice. In 1991, the three temples was designated as world heritage site by UNESCO under the name Borubudur Temple Compounds.

=== Ancient lake hypothesis ===
Speculation about a surrounding lake's existence was the subject of intense discussion among archaeologists in the 20th century, and while the idea was explored, experts concluded that a lake was not present or never surrounded the temple. Advancing the lake hypothesis in 1931, Dutch painter W.O.J. Nieuwenkamp thought Borobudur represented a lotus flower floating on a lake in what is now the Kedu Plain. Examining samples from excavations in 1974 and 1977, Ganapathi Thanikaimoni could not find any pollen or spores that would indicate vegetation endemic to a water environment; Jacques Dumarçay published this work in 1977, as did Thanikaimoni in 1983. Caesar Voûte and J.J. Nossin made field studies in 1985–86 that confirmed the absence of a lake around Borobudur when it was built.

In 2004, Murwanto et al reiterated the theory from Nieuwenkamp that Borobudur was built above the floor of a dried-out paleolake. In 2015, the lake was hypothesized to be existed from the Late Pleistocene to the Late Holocene before disappearing due to volcanic and tectonic activity. Aquatic plant pollen, such as Nuphar and Nymphaea was also identified within black clay deposits found in the area. In 2023, the existence of ancient lake was strengthened based on finding of the alluvial deposit that located between 50 and 525 meters below the kedu plain.

== History ==
=== Construction ===
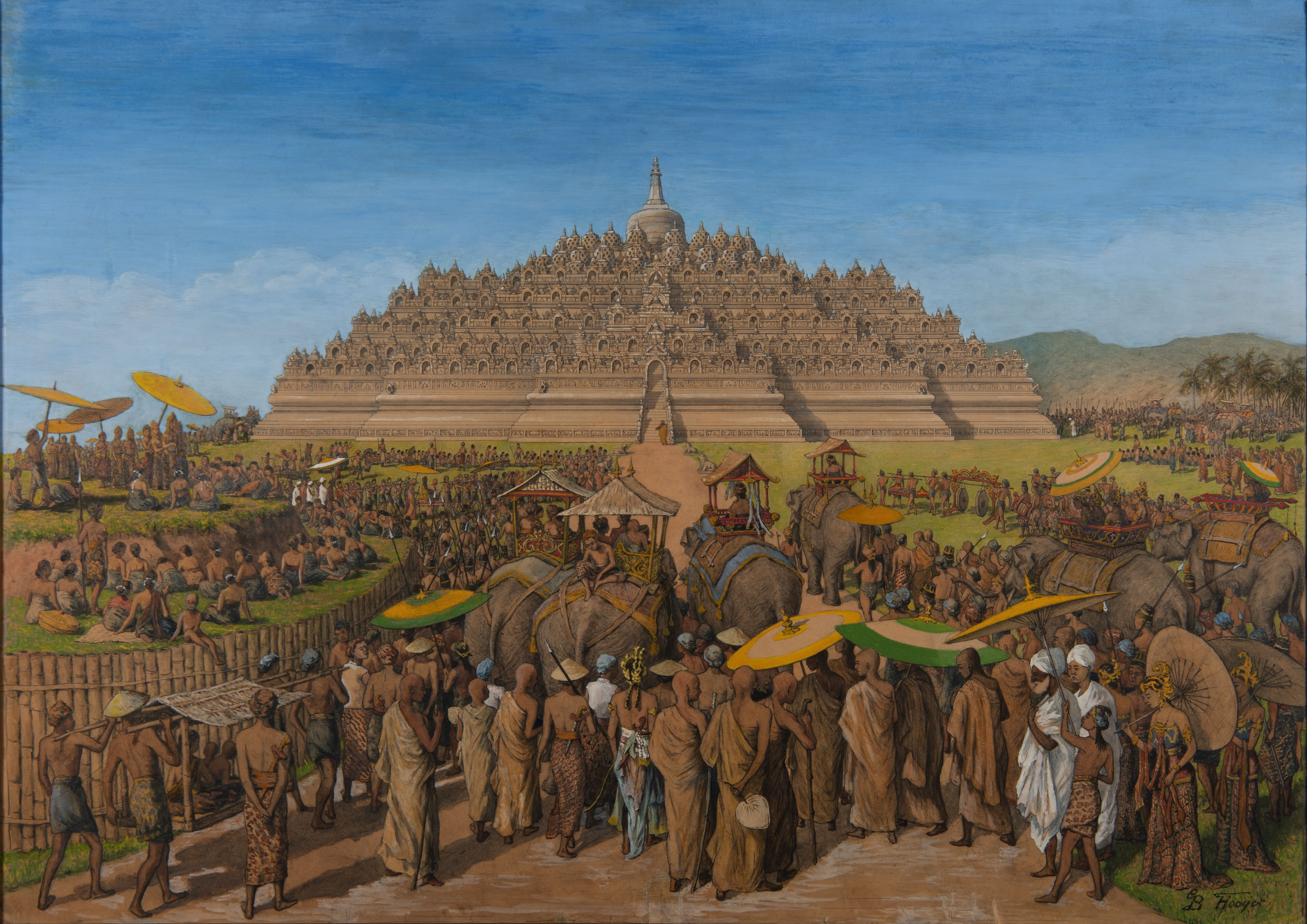
A painting by G.B. Hooijer (c. 1916–1919) reconstructing the scene of Borobudur during its heyday

Hindu clerics appealed to the people of Java for generations, a fact that architect and author Jacques Dumarçay finds first mentioned in 450 AD. Influence of the Sailendra and Sanjaya dynasties followed. Dumarçay says that de Casparis concluded that Sanjaya and Sailendra shared power in central Java for a century and a half, and that de Casparis traced alternating succession from 732 until 882. During this time many Hindu and Buddhist monuments were built on the plains and mountains around the Kedu Plain. Buddhist monuments, including Borobudur, were erected around the same period as the Hindu Prambanan temple compound. In 732 AD, King Sanjaya commissioned a Shivalinga sanctuary to be built on the Wukir hill, only 10 km (6.2 mi) east of Borobudur.

There are no known records of construction or the intended purpose of Borobudur. The duration of construction has been estimated by comparison of carved reliefs on the temple's hidden foot and the inscriptions commonly used in royal charters during the 8th and 9th centuries. Comparison of an Indian architectural process across temples, and acknowledgment of who was in power, enabled Dumarçay to approximately date the construction of Borobudur in five stages. Loosely, the Sailendra began c. 780, and continued stages two and three c. 792 through to an unremarkable fourth stage during their decline c. 824. The Sanjaya completed Borobudur's fifth stage c. 833. (Note: Miksic says construction of Borobudur began around 760 or 770, with sporadic activity until around 830 AD. Munoz says the Sailendra king Samaratungga completed Borobudur in 825 AD.)

Construction of Buddhist temples, including Borobudur, at that time was possible because Sanjaya's immediate successor, Rakai Panangkaran, granted his permission to the Buddhist followers to build such temples. In fact, to show his respect, Panangkaran gave the village of Kalasan to the Buddhist community, as is written in the Kalasan Charter dated 779 AD. This has led some archaeologists to believe that there was never serious conflict concerning religion in Java as it was possible for a Hindu king to patronize the establishment of a Buddhist monument; or for a Buddhist king to act likewise. The 856 battle on the Ratubaka plateau was much after and was a political battle. There was a climate of peaceful coexistence where Sailendra involvement existed in Prambanan.

=== Abandonment ===
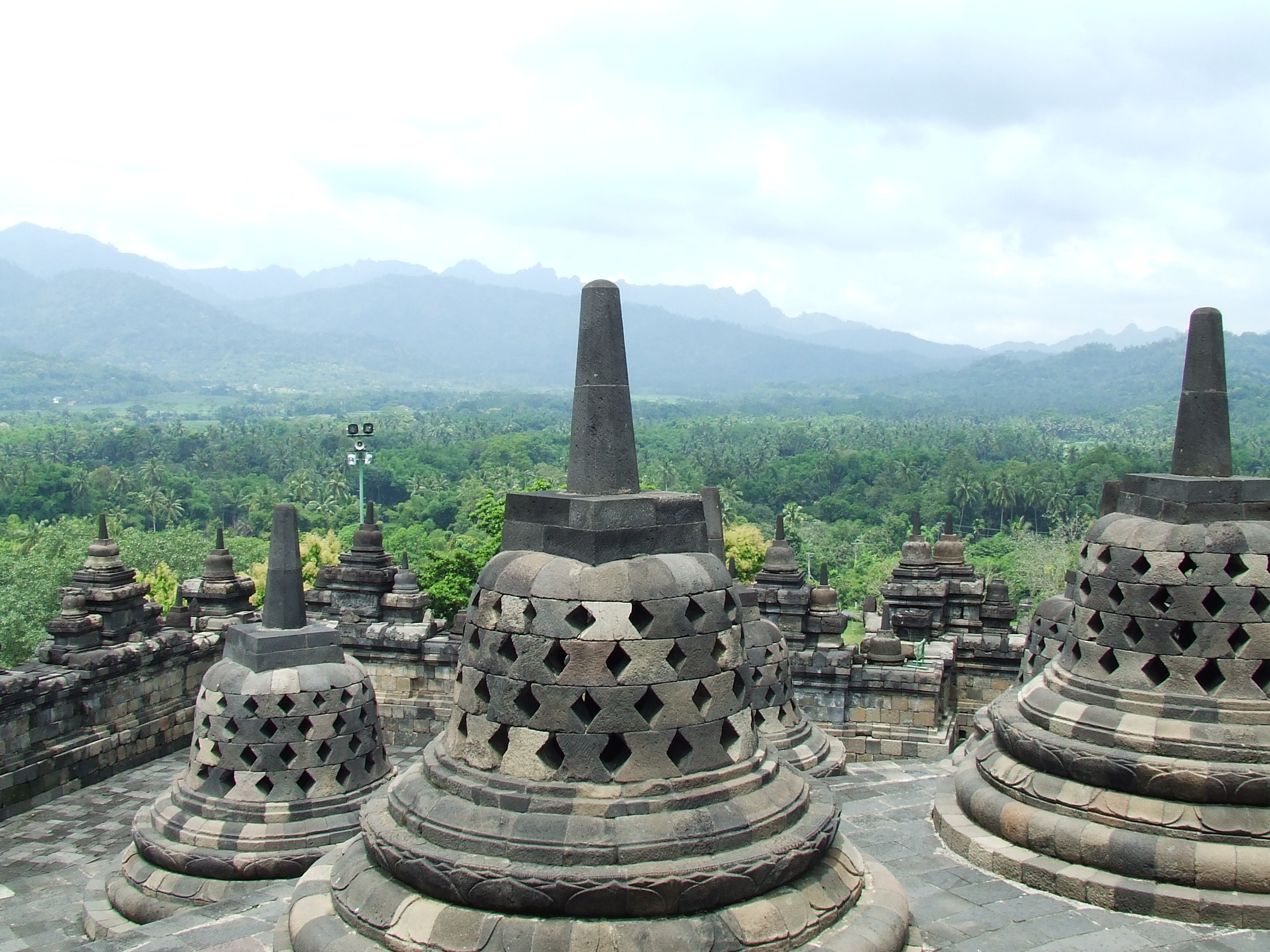
Borobudur stupas overlooking a mountain. For centuries, it was deserted.

Borobudur lay hidden for centuries under layers of volcanic ash and jungle growth. The facts behind its abandonment remain a mystery. It is not known when active use of the monument and Buddhist pilgrimage to it ceased. Sometime between 928 and 1006, King Mpu Sindok moved the capital of the Mataram kingdom to the region of East Java after a series of volcanic eruptions; it is not certain whether this influenced the abandonment, but several sources mention this as the most likely period of abandonment. The monument is mentioned vaguely as late as c. 1365, in Mpu Prapanca's Nagarakretagama, written during the Majapahit era and mentioning "the vihara in Budur".

Raden Soekmono mentioned the assumption of the temple abandonment, which occurred after the population had converted to Islam in the 15th century. The monument was not forgotten completely, and folk stories gradually became superstitious beliefs associated with bad luck and misery, which Soekmono relates. According to the Babad Tanah Jawi (or the History of Java), the monument was a fatal factor for a rebel who revolted against the king of Mataram in 1709. The insurgent was defeated and sentenced to death. In the Babad Mataram (or the History of the Mataram Kingdom), the monument was associated with the misfortune of the crown prince of the Yogyakarta Sultanate in 1757. In spite of a taboo against visiting the monument, the prince "took such pity on 'the knight who was captured in a cage' (i.e. the statue in one of the perforated stupas) that he could not help coming to see his 'unfortunate friend'". Upon returning to his palace, the prince fell ill and died one day later.

=== Rediscovery ===
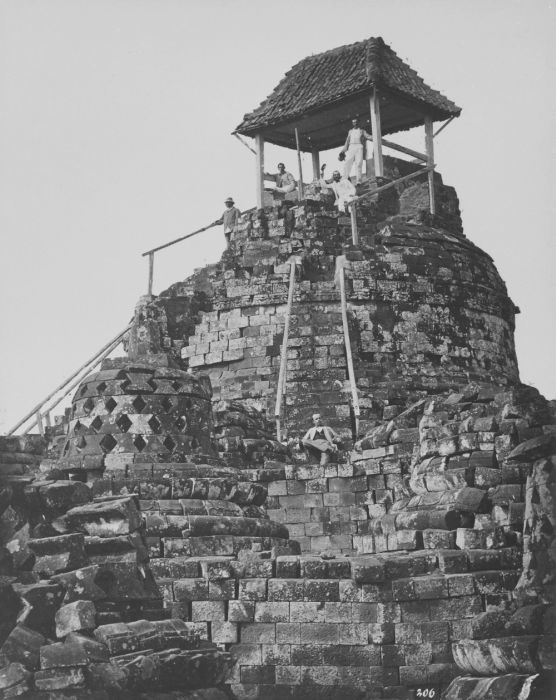
Borobudur's main stupa in mid 19th-century; a wooden deck had been installed above the main stupa

Following its capture, Java was under British administration from 1811 to 1816. Britain's representative and governor-general was Stamford Raffles, who took great interest in the history of Java. He collected Javanese antiques and made notes through contacts with local inhabitants during his tour throughout the island. On an inspection tour to Semarang in 1814, he was informed about a big monument deep in a jungle near the village of Bumisegoro. He sent Hermann Cornelius, a Dutch engineer who, among other antiquity explorations had uncovered the Sewu complex in 1806–07, to investigate. In two months, Cornelius and his 200 men cut down trees, burned down vegetation and dug away the earth to reveal the monument. Due to the danger of collapse, he could not unearth all galleries. Cornelius reported his findings to Raffles, including various drawings. Although Raffles mentioned the discovery in only a few sentences in his book, and did not visit the site himself, he has been credited with the monument's rediscovery, as the one who had brought it to the world's attention.

Christiaan Lodewijk Hartmann, the resident of the Kedu region, continued Cornelius's work, and in 1835, the whole complex was finally unearthed. His interest in Borobudur was more personal than official. Hartmann did not write any reports of his activities, in particular, the alleged story that he discovered the large statue of Buddha in the main stupa. In 1842, Hartmann investigated the main dome, although what he discovered is unknown and the main stupa remains empty.

The Dutch East Indies government then commissioned Frans Carel Wilsen, a Dutch engineering official, who studied the monument and drew hundreds of relief sketches. Jan Frederik Gerrit Brumund was also appointed to make a detailed study of the monument, which was completed in 1859. The government intended to publish an article based on Brumund's study supplemented by Wilsen's drawings, but Brumund refused to cooperate. The government then commissioned another scholar, Conradus Leemans, who compiled a monograph based on Brumund's and Wilsen's sources. In 1873, the first monograph of the detailed study of Borobudur was published, followed by its French translation a year later. The first photograph of the monument was taken in 1872 by the Dutch-Flemish engraver Isidore van Kinsbergen.

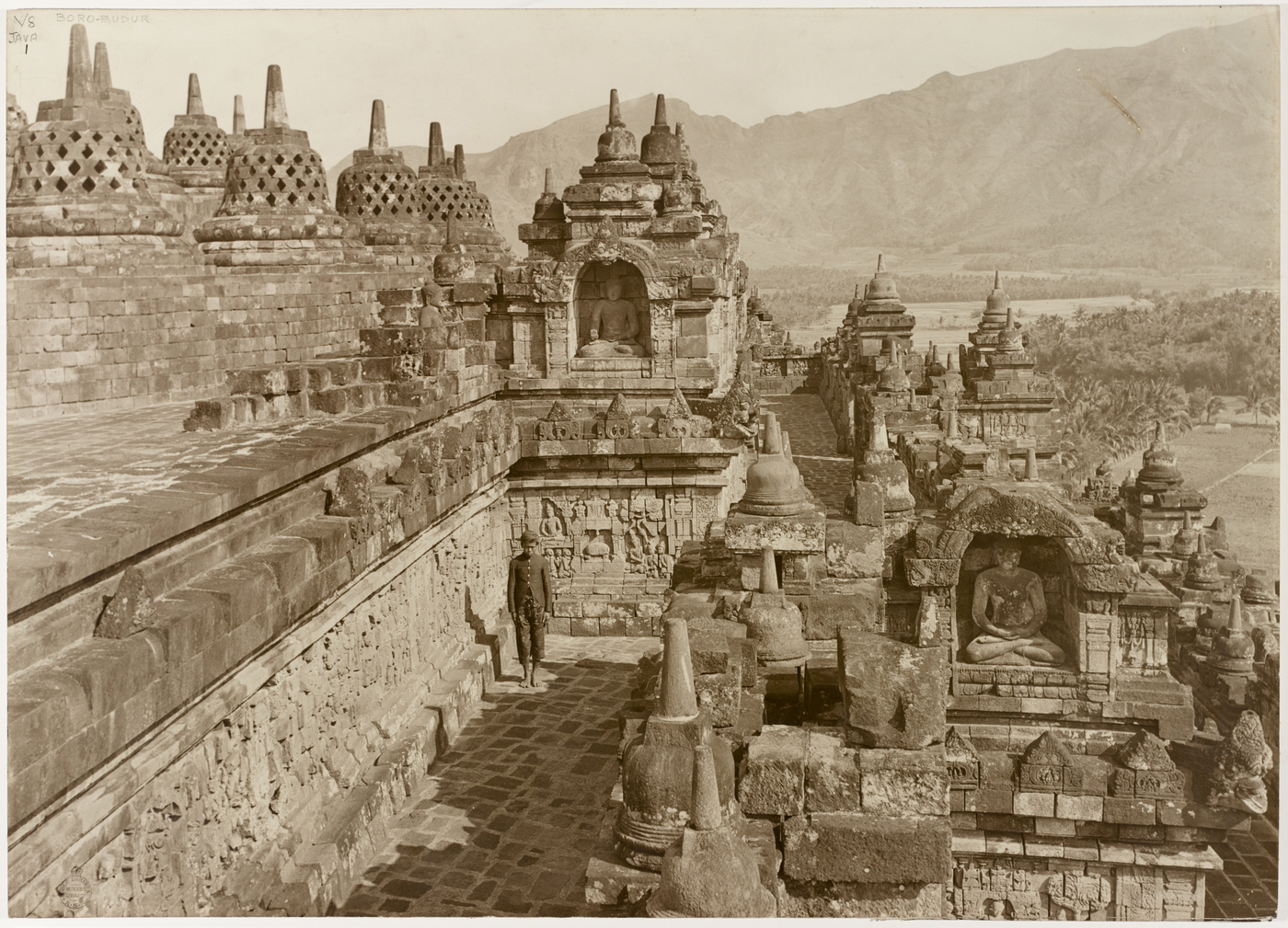
Terrace on the temple of Borobudur 1913

In 1882, the chief inspector of cultural artifacts recommended that Borobudur be entirely disassembled with the relocation of reliefs into museums due to the unstable condition of the monument. As a result, the government appointed Willem Pieter Groeneveldt, curator of the archaeological collection of the Batavian Society of Arts and Sciences, to undertake a thorough investigation of the site and to assess the actual condition of the complex; his report found that these fears were unjustified and recommended it be left intact.

Borobudur was considered as the source of souvenirs, and parts of its sculptures were looted, some even with colonial-government consent. In 1896 King Chulalongkorn of Siam visited Java and requested and was allowed to take home eight cartloads of sculptures taken from Borobudur. These include thirty pieces taken from a number of relief panels, five buddha images, two lions, one gargoyle, several kala motifs from the stairs and gateways, and a guardian statue (dvarapala). Several of these artifacts, most notably the lions, dvarapala, kala, makara and giant waterspouts are now on display in the Java Art room in The National Museum in Bangkok.

=== Restoration ===
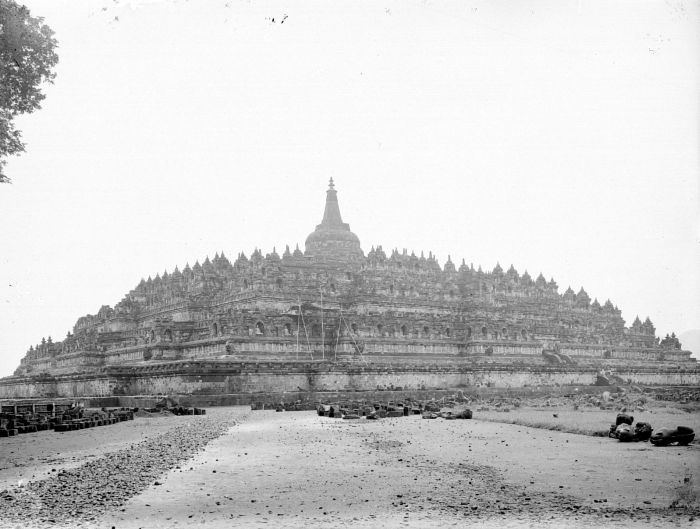
Borobudur after van Erp's restoration in 1911. The chhatra pinnacle is now dismantled.

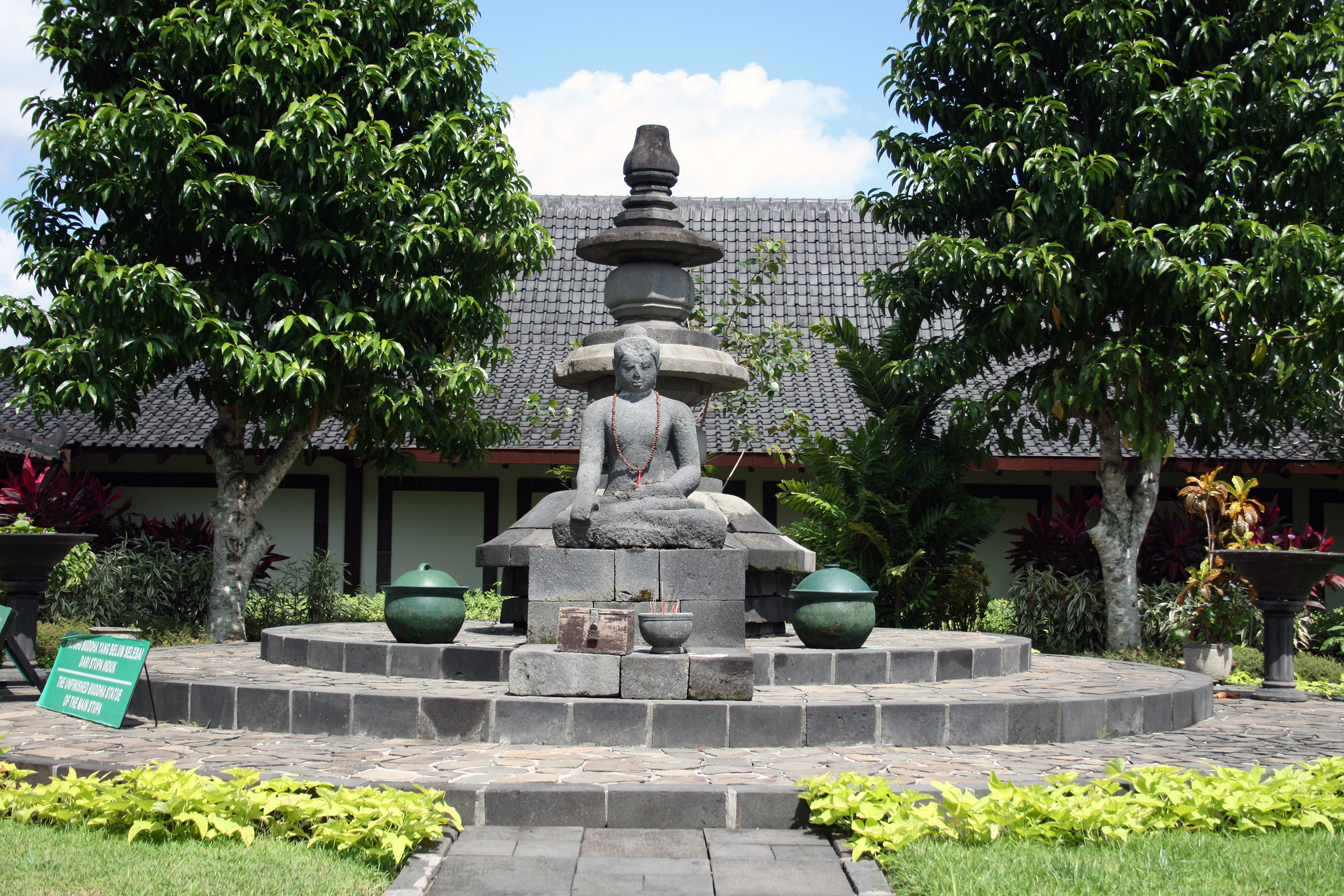
The Unfinished Buddha (front) and the main stupa's chhatra (rear) at Karmawibhangga Museum

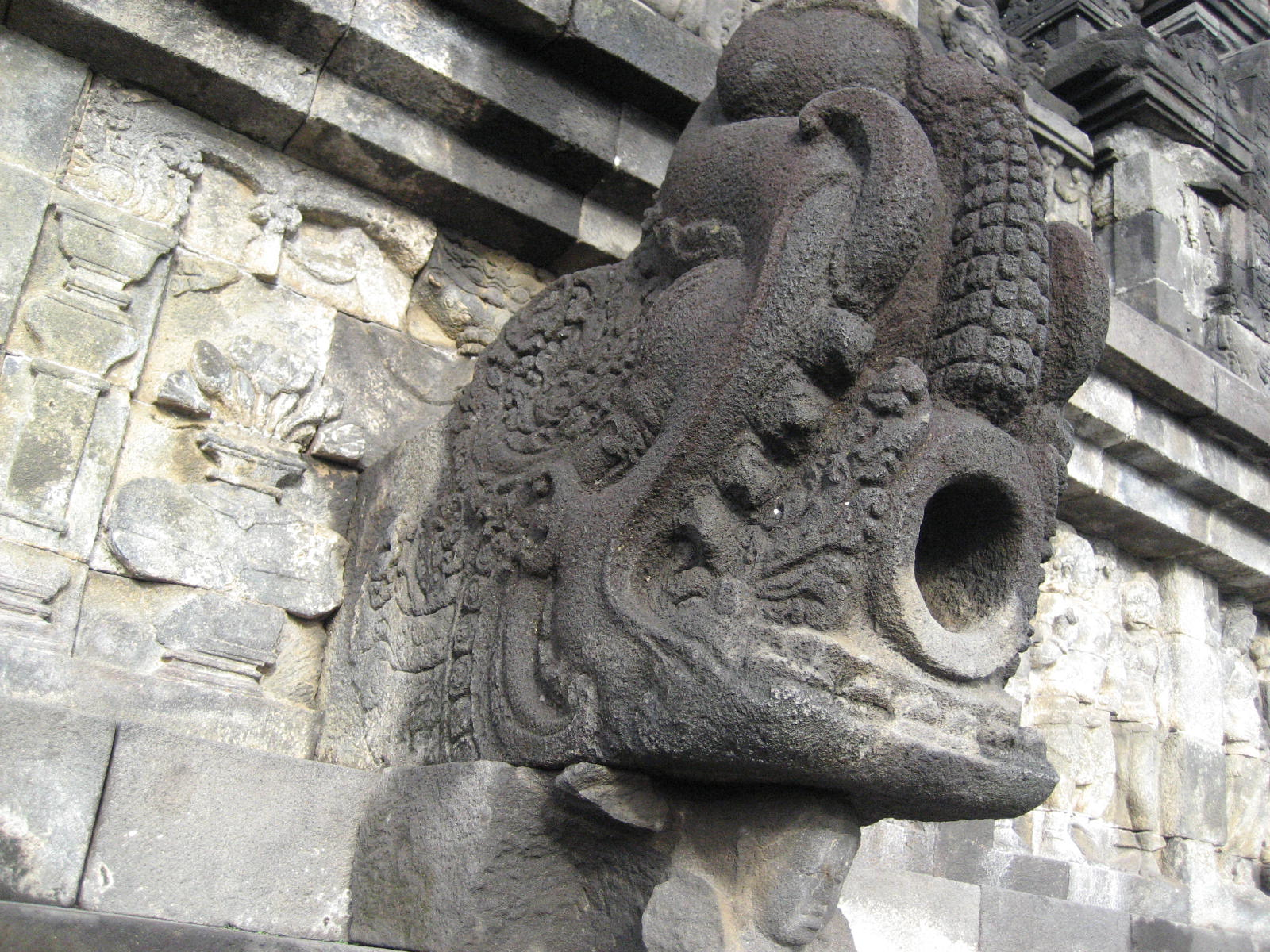
Water spout of drainage systems in Borobudur temple

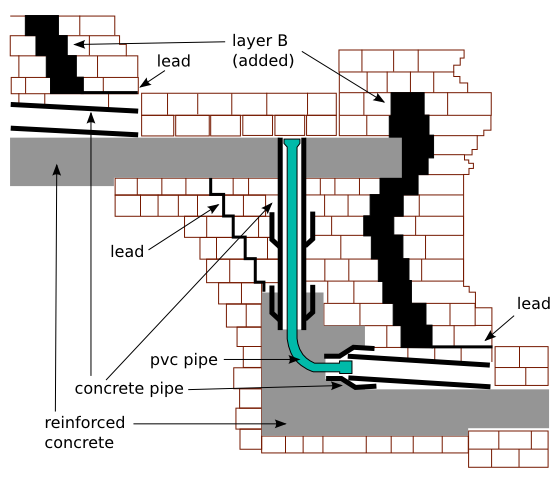
Concrete and PVC pipe improve drainage system (1973)

Borobudur attracted attention in 1885, when the Dutch engineer Jan Willem IJzerman, chairman of the Archaeological Society in Yogyakarta, discovered that the temple base enclosed a hidden foot. Photographs made in 1890–1891 revealed reliefs on the hidden foot; the coverings were then replaced. The discovery led the Dutch East Indies government to take steps to safeguard the monument. In 1900, a three-member commission formed to plan protection, and in 1902, the commission submitted a threefold proposal. First, collapse could be avoided by resetting the corners, removing stones that endangered the adjacent parts, strengthening the first balustrades and restoring several niches, archways, stupas and the main dome. Second, care should be maintained and water discharge should be improved by restoring floors and spouts. Third, all loose stones should be removed, the monument cleared up to the first balustrades, disfigured stones removed and the main dome restored. In 1905, the proposal was approved, and the total cost was estimated at that time around 48,800 Dutch guilders (equivalent to ƒ1,723,019 in 2022).

The restoration began in 1907, led by Theodoor van Erp, a Dutch army engineer. The first seven months of restoration were occupied with excavating the grounds around the monument to find missing Buddha heads and panel stones. Van Erp dismantled and rebuilt the upper three circular platforms and stupas. Along the way, van Erp discovered more things he could do to improve the monument; he submitted another proposal in 1908, which was approved with the additional budget of 34,600 guilders (equivalent to ƒ1,137,702 in 2022). The restoration was completed in 1911 and at first glance, Borobudur had been restored to its old glory. Van Erp went further by carefully reconstructing the chattra (three-tiered parasol) pinnacle on top of the main stupa. However, he later dismantled the chattra, citing that there were not enough original stones used in reconstructing the pinnacle, which means that the original design of Borobudur's pinnacle is actually unknown. The dismantled chattra now is stored in Karmawibhangga Museum, a few hundred meters north from Borobudur.

Due to the limited budget, the restoration had been primarily focused on cleaning the sculptures, and van Erp did not solve the drainage problem. Within fifteen years, the gallery walls were sagging, and the reliefs showed signs of new cracks and deterioration. Van Erp used concrete from which alkali salts and calcium hydroxide leached and were transported into the rest of the construction. This caused some problems, so that a further thorough renovation was urgently needed.

Small restorations had been performed since then, but not sufficient for complete protection. During World War II and Indonesian National Revolution in 1945 to 1949, Borobudur restoration efforts were halted. The monument suffered further from the weather and drainage problems, which caused the earth core inside the temple to expand, pushing the stone structure and tilting the walls. By 1950s some parts of Borobudur were facing imminent danger of collapsing. In 1965, Indonesia asked the UNESCO for advice on ways to counteract the problem of weathering at Borobudur and other monuments. In 1968, Soekmono, then head of the Archeological Service of Indonesia, launched his "Save Borobudur" campaign, in an effort to organize a massive restoration project.

In the late 1960s, the Indonesian government had requested from the international community a major renovation to protect the monument. In 1973, a master plan to restore Borobudur was created. Through an Agreement concerning the Voluntary Contributions to be Given for the Execution of the Project to Preserve Borobudur (Paris, 29 January 1973), Australia, Belgium, Cyprus, France and Germany agreed to contribute to the restoration. The Indonesian government and UNESCO then undertook the complete overhaul of the monument in a big restoration project between 1975 and 1982.

In 1975, the actual work began. Over one million stones were dismantled and removed during the restoration, and set aside like pieces of a massive jig-saw puzzle to be individually identified, catalogued, cleaned and treated for preservation. Borobudur became a testing ground for new conservation techniques, including new procedures to battle the microorganisms attacking the stone. The attempt was made to restore the structure as much as possible using reassembled original materials (anastylosis method), with new andesite stone blocks used sparingly to replaces some missing stones, only to ensure structural integrity. The foundation was stabilized, and all 1,460 panels were cleaned. The restoration involved the dismantling of the five square platforms and the improvement of drainage by embedding water channels into the monument. Both impermeable and filter layers were added. This colossal project involved around 600 people to restore the monument and cost a total of US$6,901,243 (equivalent to US$50,052,118 in 2025).

After the renovation was finished, UNESCO listed Borobudur as a World Heritage Site in 1991. It is listed under Cultural criteria (i) "to represent a masterpiece of human creative genius", (ii) "to exhibit an important interchange of human values, over a span of time or within a cultural area of the world, on developments in architecture or technology, monumental arts, town-planning or landscape design", and (vi) "to be directly or tangibly associated with events or living traditions, with ideas, or with beliefs, with artistic and literary works of outstanding universal significance".

In December 2017, the idea to reinstall chattra on top of Borobudur main stupa's yasthi has been revisited. However, an expert said a thorough study is needed on restoring the umbrella-shaped pinnacle. By early 2018, the chattra restoration has not yet commenced.

=== Contemporary events ===
==== Religious ceremony ====
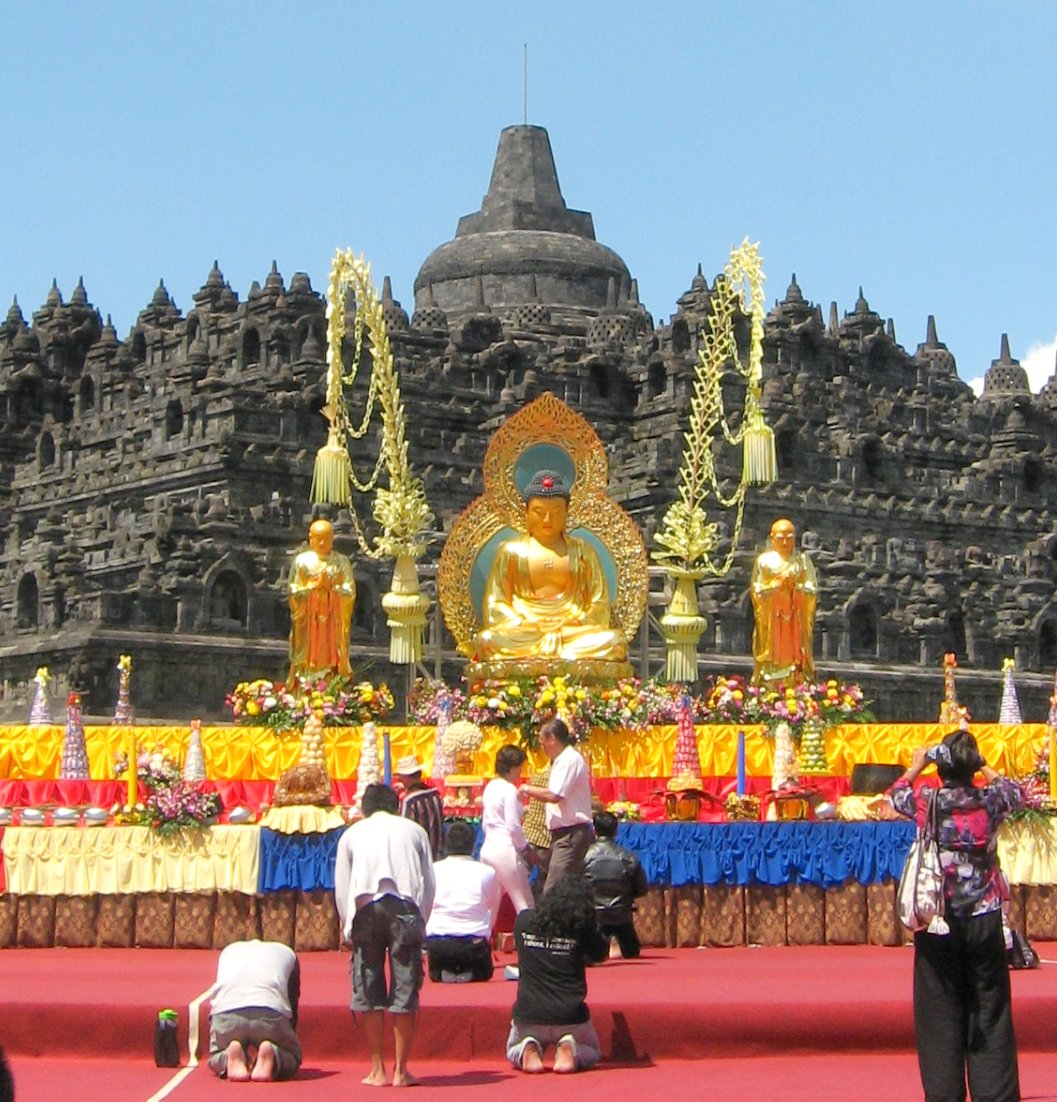
Vesak ceremony at Borobudur

Following the major 1973 renovation funded by UNESCO, Borobudur is once again used as a place of worship and pilgrimage. Once a year, during the full moon in May or June, Buddhists in Indonesia observe Vesak (Indonesian: Waisak) day commemorating the birth, death, and the time when Siddhārtha Gautama attained the perfect enlightenment to become the Buddha. Waisak is an official national holiday in Indonesia, and the ceremony is centered at the three Buddhist temples by walking from Mendut to Pawon and ending at Borobudur.

The rituals held in Borobudur including Pradakshina or circumabulating Borobudur clockwise while also ascending the stages of Borobudur through the galleries, meditation surrounding Borobudur, and might also include the release of sky lanterns. In contemporary Indonesia, Borobudur is often cited as an example of religious coexistence, as a major Buddhist monument preserved within a predominantly Muslim country and recognized as part of the nation's shared cultural heritage.

==== Tourism ====
The monument is the single most visited tourist attraction in Indonesia. In 1974, 260,000 tourists visited the monument; 36,000 of them were foreigners. The figure climbed to 2.5 million visitors annually (80% were domestic tourists) in the mid-1990s, before the country's economic crisis. Tourism development, however, has been criticized for not including the local community, giving rise to occasional conflicts. In 2003, residents and small businesses around Borobudur organized several meetings and poetry protests, objecting to a provincial government plan to build a three-storey mall complex, dubbed "Java World".

In June 2012, Borobudur was recorded in the Guinness Book of World Records as the world's largest Buddhist temple.

==== Conservation ====
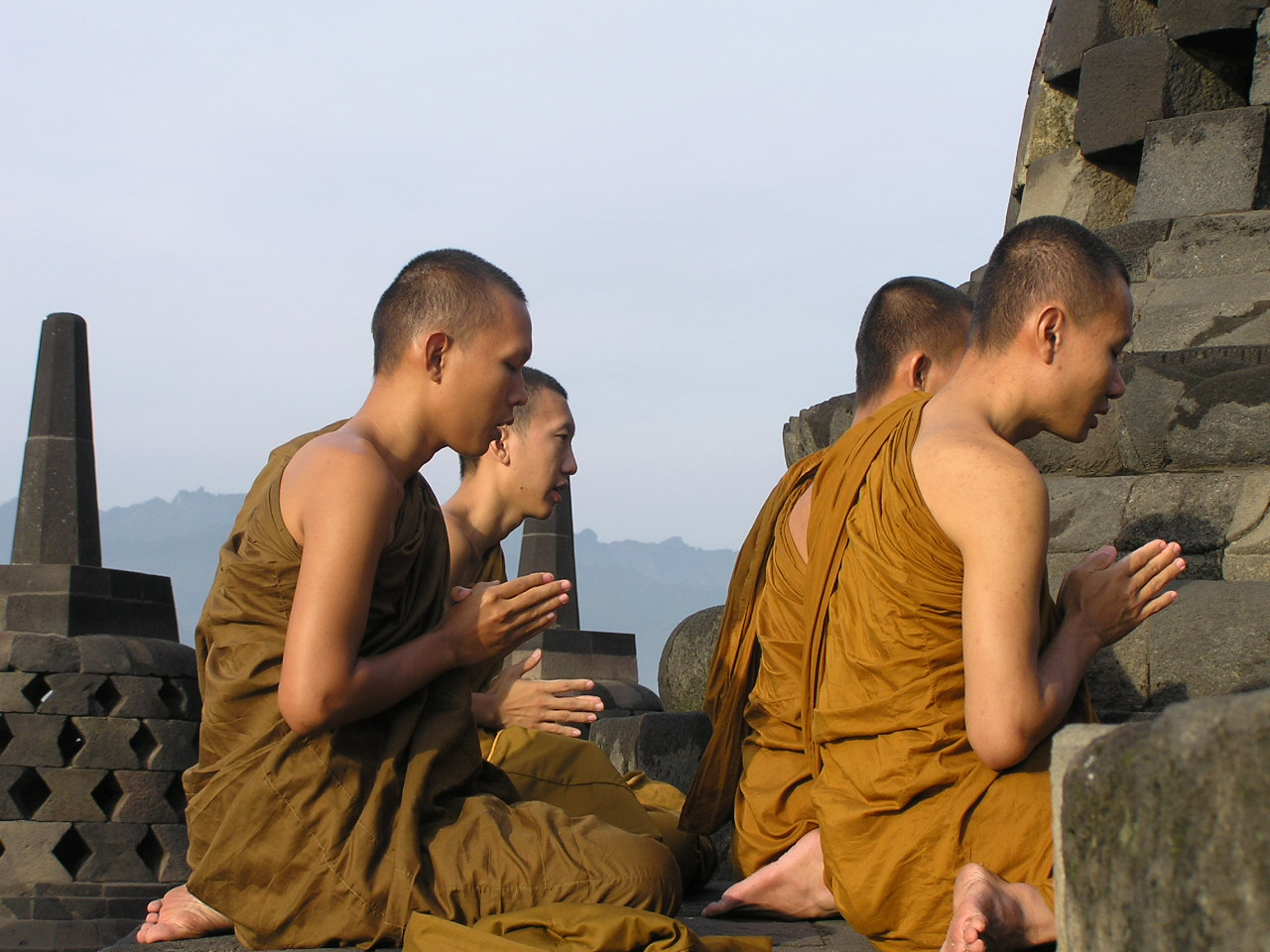
Buddhist monks chant on the top platform

UNESCO identified three specific areas of concern under the present state of conservation: (i) vandalism by visitors; (ii) soil erosion in the south-eastern part of the site; and (iii) analysis and restoration of missing elements. The soft soil, the numerous earthquakes and heavy rains lead to the destabilization of the structure. Earthquakes are by far the most important contributing factors, since not only do stones fall down and arches crumble, but the earth itself can move in waves, further destroying the structure. The increasing popularity of the stupa brings in many visitors, most of whom are from Indonesia. Despite warning signs on all levels not to touch anything, the regular transmission of warnings over loudspeakers and the presence of guards, vandalism on reliefs and statues is a common occurrence and problem, leading to further deterioration.

==== Rehabilitation ====
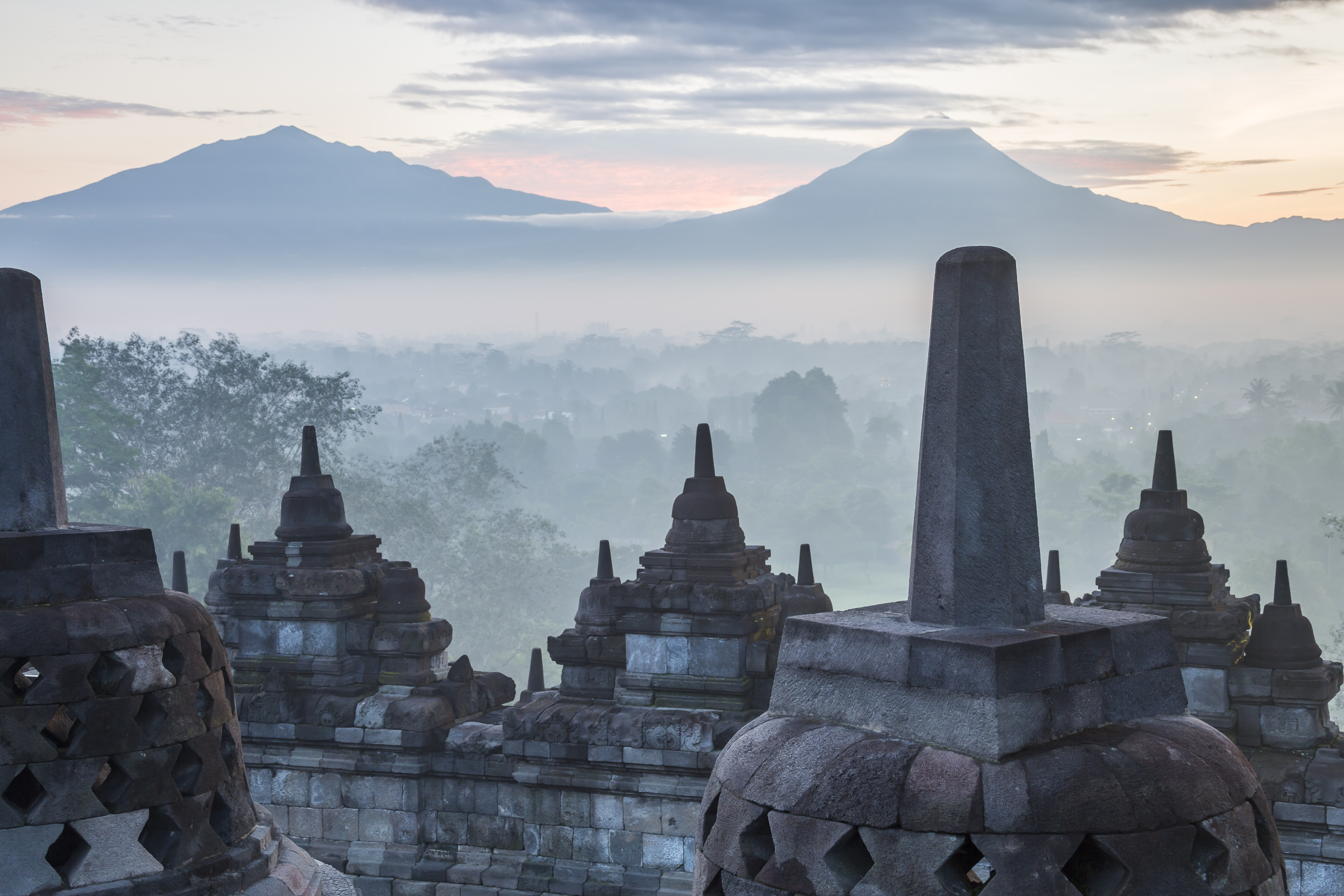
Borobudur is surrounded by mountains, including twin volcanoes Mount Merbabu (left) and Mount Merapi (right).

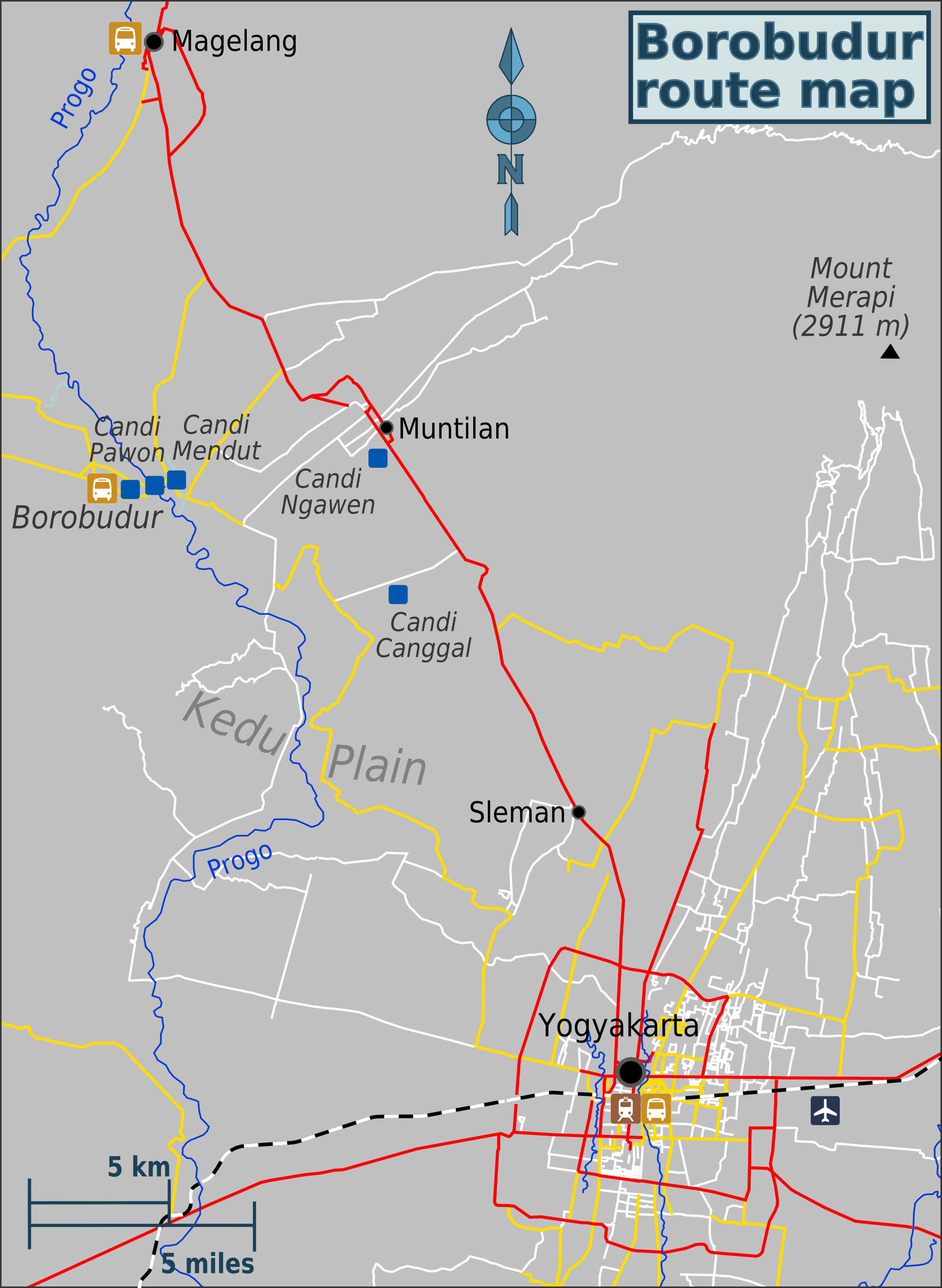
Location of Borobudur relative to Mount Merapi and Yogyakarta

Borobudur was heavily affected by the eruption of Mount Merapi in October and November 2010. Volcanic ash from Merapi fell on the temple complex, which is approximately 28 kilometres (17 mi) west-southwest of the crater. A layer of ash up to 2.5 centimetres (1 in) thick fell on the temple statues during the eruption of 3–5 November, covering the reliefs and clogging the drainage-system, with experts fearing that the acidic ash might damage the historic site. The temple complex was closed from 5 to 9 November to clean up the ashfall.

UNESCO donated US$3 million (equivalent to US$4,293,639 in 2025) as a part of the costs towards the rehabilitation of Borobudur after Mount Merapi's 2010 eruption. More than 55,000 stone blocks comprising the temple's structure were dismantled to restore the drainage system, which had been clogged by slurry after the rain. The restoration was finished in November.

In January 2012, two German stone-conservation experts spent ten days at the site analyzing the temples and making recommendations to ensure their long-term preservation. In June, Germany agreed to contribute US$130,000 (equivalent to US$182,309 in 2025) to UNESCO for the second phase of rehabilitation, in which six experts in stone conservation, microbiology, structural engineering and chemical engineering would spend a week in Borobudur in June, then return for another visit in September or October. These missions would launch the preservation activities recommended in the January report and would include capacity building activities to enhance the preservation capabilities of governmental staff and young conservation experts.

On 14 February 2014, major tourist attractions in Yogyakarta and Central Java, including Borobudur, Prambanan and Ratu Boko, were closed to visitors, after being severely affected by the volcanic ash from the eruption of Kelud volcano in East Java, located around 200 kilometers east from Yogyakarta. Workers covered the iconic stupas and statues of Borobudur temple to protect the structure from volcanic ash. The Kelud volcano erupted on 13 February 2014 with an explosion heard as far away as Yogyakarta.

==== Security threats ====
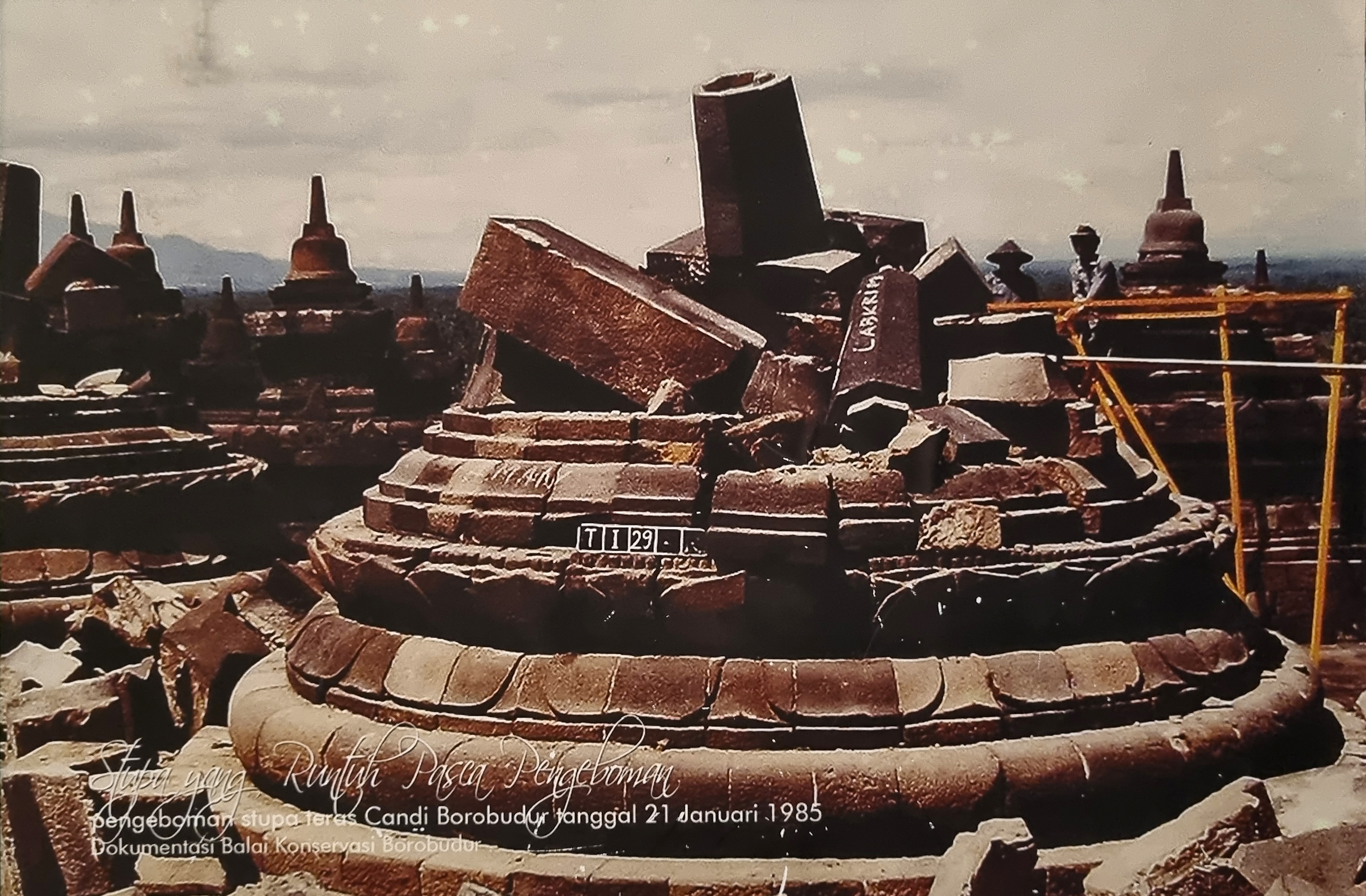
The damage of several stupas of Borobudur upper terraces caused by a terrorist attack on 21 January 1985

On 21 January 1985, nine stupas were badly damaged by nine bombs. In 1991, a blind Muslim preacher, Husein Ali Al Habsyie, was sentenced to life imprisonment for masterminding a series of bombings in the mid-1980s, including the temple attack. Two other members of the Islamic extremist group that carried out the bombings were each sentenced to 20 years in 1986, and another man received a 13-year prison term.

On 27 May 2006, an earthquake of 6.2 magnitude struck the south coast of Central Java. The event caused severe damage around the region and casualties to the nearby city of Yogyakarta and Prambanan, but Borobudur remained intact.

In August 2014, Indonesian police and security forces tightened the security in and around Borobudur temple compound, as a precaution to a threat posted on social media by a self-proclaimed Indonesian branch of ISIS, citing that the terrorists planned to destroy Borobudur and other statues in Indonesia. The security improvements included the repair and increased deployment of CCTV monitors and the implementation of a night patrol in and around the temple compound. The jihadist group follows a strict interpretation of Islam that condemns any anthropomorphic representations such as sculptures as idolatry.

==== Visitor overload problem ====
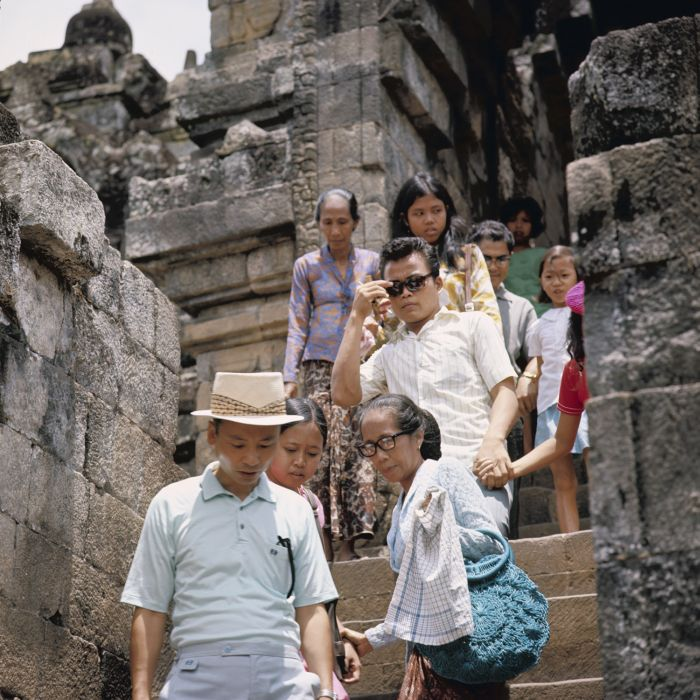
Tourists in Borobudur

The high volume of visitors ascending the Borobudur's narrow stairs has caused severe wear to the stones of these stairs, eroding the stones' surface and making them thinner and smoother. Overall, Borobudur has 2,033 surfaces of stone stairs, spread over four cardinal directions; including the west side, the east, south and north. There are around 1,028 surfaces of them, or about 49.15 percent, that are severely worn out.

To avoid further wear of stairs' stones, since November 2014, two main sections of Borobudur stairs—the eastern (ascending route) and northern (descending route) sides—have been covered with wooden structures. A similar method has been used in Angkor Wat in Cambodia and on the Egyptian Pyramids. In March 2015, Borobudur Conservation Center proposed further to seal the stairs with rubber cover.

Due to vandalism and graffiti, access to the temple grounds was temporarily blocked in 2020. Since then, a maximum of 1200 visitors are allowed to enter the temple for one hour a day accompanied by tourist guides. Visitors are expected to wear bamboo slippers.

According to Statistics Indonesia, the number of domestic tourists rose from 422,930 in 2021 to 1.44 million in 2022. The Indonesian government is aiming to increase the number of tourists to 2 million per year.

== Architecture ==
The archaeological excavation into Borobudur during reconstruction suggests that adherents of Hinduism or a pre-Indic faith had already begun to erect a large structure on Borobudur's hill before the site was appropriated by Buddhists. The foundations are unlike any Hindu or Buddhist shrine structures, and therefore, the initial structure is considered more indigenous Javanese than Hindu or Buddhist.

=== Design ===
Borobudur floor plan in the shape of a mandala

Borobudur is built as a single large stupa and, when viewed from above, takes the form of a giant tantric Buddhist mandala, simultaneously representing the Buddhist cosmology and the nature of mind. The original foundation is a square, approximately 118 metres (387 ft) on each side. It has nine platforms, of which the lower six are square and the upper three are circular. The upper platform contains seventy-two small stupas surrounding one large central stupa. Each stupa is bell-shaped and pierced by numerous decorative openings. Statues of the Buddha sit inside the pierced enclosures.

The design of Borobudur took the form of a step pyramid. Previously, the prehistoric Austronesian megalithic culture in Indonesia had constructed several earth mounds and stone step pyramid structures called punden berundak as discovered in Pangguyangan site near Cisolok and in Cipari near Kuningan. The construction of stone pyramids is based on native beliefs that mountains and high places are the abode of ancestral spirits or hyangs.

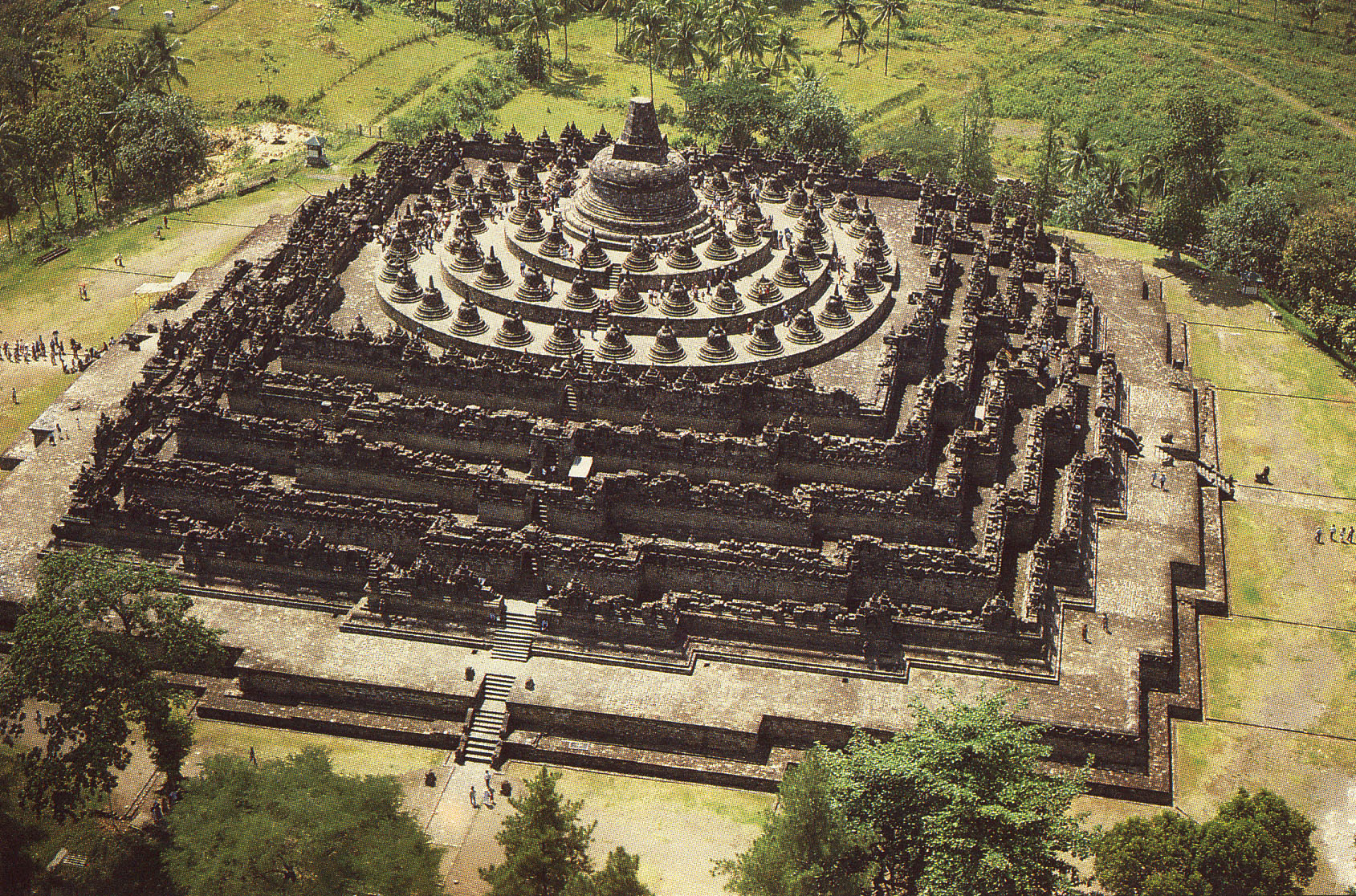
Aerial view of Borobudur shows the step pyramid and mandala plan.

Many sources conventionally divide the terraces of Borobudur into three levels, which is thought to symbolize the three "realms" of Buddhist cosmology, namely Kamadhatu (the world of desires), Rupadhatu (the world of forms), and finally Arupadhatu (the formless world). Kāmadhātu is represented by the base, Rupadhatu by the five square platforms (the body), and Arupadhatu by the three circular platforms and the large topmost stupa. Recent scholarship however question this assumption. The "three realm" division was first proposed by Willem Frederik Stutterheim in the early 20th century based on then very fragmentary data. Later scholars have criticized this division as having no textual basis or narrative support in the monument itself. However, this conventional division is still often presented uncritically in popular media.

Congregational worship in Borobudur is performed in a walking pilgrimage. Pilgrims are guided by the system of staircases and corridors ascending to the top platform. Each platform represents one stage of enlightenment. The path that guides pilgrims was designed to symbolize Buddhist cosmology.

In 1885, a hidden structure at the base was accidentally discovered. The "hidden footing" contains complete and incomplete panel reliefs, 160 of which depict narratives concerning cause and effects according to the dharmic laws. There also panels with short inscriptions that apparently provide instructions for the sculptors, illustrating the scenes to be carved. The partly finished nature of the reliefs suggests that they were initially planned, but were later encased due to circumstances which are still debated among scholars. A practical explanation concerns structural defects that became apparent when the monument was under construction. Possibly fearing a subsidence that could cause the whole structure to slide outwards, work on the partly sculpted foot was suspended and it was encased with an additional base for stability. Scholars have also proposed various religious or symbolic grounds which may have caused the builders and commissioners of Borobudur to abandon the relief works and encased them from view.

==== Similarities with the Kesaria site ====
There are quite a few design similarities between the Borobudur and Kesaria sites. Both sites have mandalas and life like Buddhas facing the sections of the universe. Both sites have hill-like mandala structures filled with Buddhist statues. This hints at the travel of ritualistic texts and ideas between the Pala and Srivijaya domains.

=== Building structure ===
Cross-section with 4:6:9 height ratio of foot, body and head

Approximately 55,000 cubic metres (72,000 cu yd) of andesite stones were taken from neighbouring stone quarries or from the bed of the Progo River to build the monument. The stone was cut to size, transported to the site and laid without mortar. Knobs, indentations and dovetails were used to form joints between stones. The roof of stupas, niches and arched gateways were constructed in corbelling method. Reliefs were created in situ after the building had been completed.

The monument is equipped with a good drainage system to cater to the area's high stormwater run-off. To prevent flooding, 100 spouts are installed at the corners, each with a unique carved gargoyle in the shape of a giant or makara.

Borobudur differs markedly from the general design of other structures built for this purpose. Instead of being built on a flat surface, Borobudur is built on a natural hill. However, construction technique is similar to other temples in Java. Without the inner spaces seen in other temples, and with a general design similar to the shape of pyramid, Borobudur was first thought more likely to have served as a stupa, instead of a temple. A stupa is intended as a shrine for the Buddha. Sometimes stupas were built only as devotional symbols of Buddhism. A temple, on the other hand, is used as a house of worship. The meticulous complexity of the monument's design suggests that Borobudur is in fact a temple.

Little is known about Gunadharma, the architect of the complex. His name is recounted from Javanese folk tales rather than from written inscriptions.

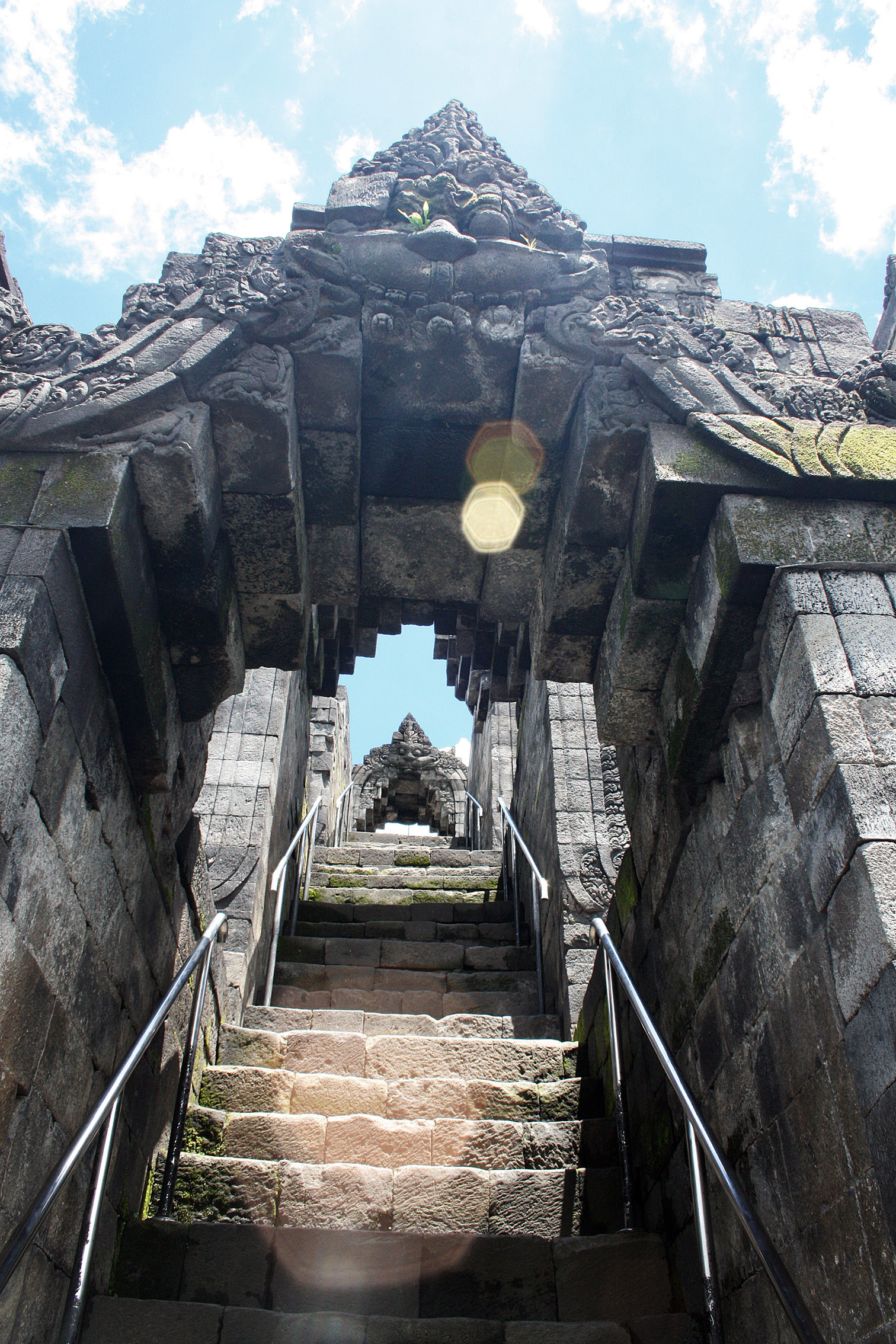
Stairs seen through arches of Kala

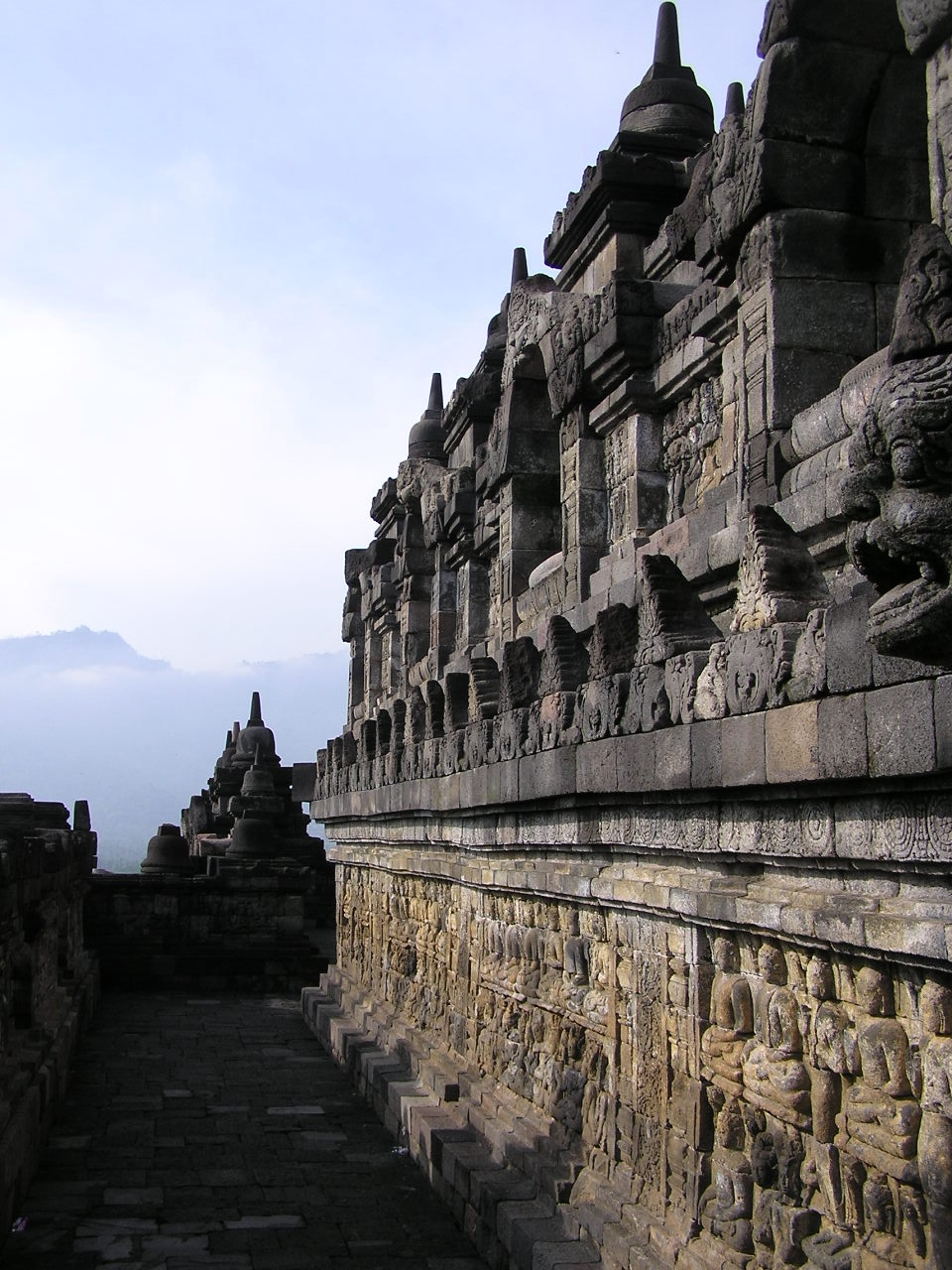
Reliefs on a corridor wall

The basic unit of measurement used during construction was the tala, defined as the length of a human face from the forehead's hairline to the tip of the chin or the distance from the tip of the thumb to the tip of the middle finger when both fingers are stretched at their maximum distance. The unit is thus relative from one individual to the next, but the monument has exact measurements. A survey conducted in 1977 revealed frequent findings of a ratio of 4:6:9 around the monument. The architect had used the formula to lay out the precise dimensions of the fractal and self-similar geometry in Borobudur's design. This ratio is also found in the designs of Pawon and Mendut, nearby Buddhist temples. Archeologists have conjectured that the 4:6:9 ratio and the tala have calendrical, astronomical and cosmological significance, as is the case with the temple of Angkor Wat in Cambodia.

The main structure can be divided into three components: base, body, and top. The base is 123 m × 123 m (404 ft × 404 ft) in size with 4 metres (13 ft) walls. The body is composed of five square platforms, each of diminishing height. The first terrace is set back 7 metres (23 ft) from the edge of the base. Each subsequent terrace is set back 2 metres (6.6 ft), leaving a narrow corridor at each stage. The top consists of three circular platforms, with each stage supporting a row of perforated stupas, arranged in concentric circles. There is one main dome at the center, the top of which is the highest point of the monument, 35 metres (115 ft) above ground level. Stairways at the center of each of the four sides give access to the top, with a number of arched gates overlooked by 32 lion statues. The gates are adorned with Kala's head carved on top of each and Makaras projecting from each side. This Kala-Makara motif is commonly found on the gates of Javanese temples. The main entrance is on the eastern side, the location of the first narrative reliefs. Stairways on the slopes of the hill also link the monument to the low-lying plain.

== Reliefs ==
Position of narrative bas-reliefs on Borobudur wall

Borobudur is constructed in such a way that it reveals various levels of terraces, showing intricate architecture that goes from being heavily ornamented with bas-reliefs to being plain in Arupadhatu circular terraces. The first four terrace walls are showcases for bas-relief sculptures. These are considered to be among the finest works of art in the Buddhist world.

The bas-reliefs in Borobudur depicted many scenes of daily life in 8th-century ancient Java, from the courtly palace life, hermit in the forest, to those of commoners in the village. It also depicted temple, marketplace, various flora and fauna, and also native vernacular architecture. People depicted here are the images of king, queen, princes, noblemen, courtier, soldier, servant, commoners, priest and hermit. The reliefs also depicted spiritual beings in Buddhism such as asuras, gods, bodhisattvas, kinnaras, gandharvas and apsaras. The images depicted on bas-relief often served as reference for historians to research for certain subjects, such as the study of architecture, weaponry, economy, fashion, and also mode of transportation of 8th-century Maritime Southeast Asia. One of the famous renderings of an 8th-century Southeast Asian double outrigger ship is Borobudur Ship. Today, the actual-size replica of Borobudur Ship that had sailed from Indonesia to Africa in 2004 is displayed in the Samudra Raksa Museum, located a few hundred meters north of Borobudur.

Narrative panels distribution
Section	Location	Story	No. of panels
hidden foot	wall	Karmavibhangga	160
first gallery	main wall	Lalitavistara	120
first gallery	main wall	Jataka/Avadana	120
first gallery	balustrade	Jataka/Avadana	372
first gallery	balustrade	Jataka/Avadana	128
second gallery	balustrade	Jataka/Avadana	100
second gallery	main wall	Gandavyuha	128
third gallery	main wall	Gandavyuha	88
third gallery	balustrade	Gandavyuha	88
fourth gallery	main wall	Gandavyuha	84
fourth gallery	balustrade	Gandavyuha	72
Total			1,460

Borobudur contains approximately 2,670 individual bas reliefs (1,460 narrative and 1,212 decorative panels), which cover the façades and balustrades. The total relief surface is 2,500 square metres (27,000 sq ft), and they are distributed at the hidden foot (Kāmadhātu) and the five square platforms (Rupadhatu).

The narrative reliefs are arranged into 11 series over a length of 3,000 metres (9,800 ft) around the hidden foot and the first four galleries of the monument. The hidden foot contains the first series with 160 narrative panels, and the remaining 10 series are distributed throughout walls and balustrades in four galleries starting from the eastern entrance stairway to the left. Narrative panels on the wall read from right to left, while those on the balustrade read from left to right. This conforms with pradaksina, the ritual of circumambulation performed by pilgrims who move in a clockwise direction while keeping the sanctuary to their right.

The hidden foot depicts the workings of karmic law. The walls of the first gallery have two superimposed series of reliefs; each consists of 120 panels. The upper part depicts the biography of the Buddha, while the lower part of the wall and also the balustrades in the first and the second galleries tell the story of the Buddha's former lives. The remaining panels are devoted to Sudhana's further wandering about his search, terminated by his attainment of the Perfect Wisdom.

=== The law of karma (Karmavibhanga) ===
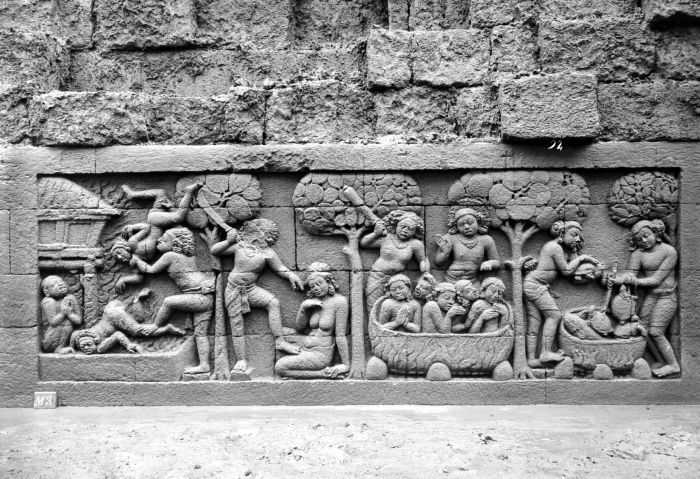
Scene illustrating a narrative from the Karmavibhanga Sutra on Borobudur's hidden foot (Note: On the right depicts sinful act of killing and cooking turtles and fishes. On the left, those who make a living by killing animals will be tortured in hell, by being cooked alive, being cut, or being thrown into a burning house.)

The 160 hidden panels do not form a continuous story, but each panel provides one complete illustration of cause and effect. There are depictions of blameworthy activities, from gossip to murder, with their corresponding punishments. There are also praiseworthy activities, that include charity and pilgrimage to sanctuaries, and their subsequent rewards. The pains of hell and the pleasure of heaven are also illustrated. There are scenes of daily life, complete with the full panorama of saṃsāra (the endless cycle of birth and death). The encasement base of the Borobudur temple was disassembled to reveal the hidden foot, and the reliefs were photographed by Casijan Chepas between 1890 and 1891. It is these photographs that are displayed in Borobudur Museum (Karmawibhangga Museum), located just several hundred meters north of the temple. During the restoration, the foot encasement was reinstalled, covering the Karmavibhanga reliefs. Today, only the southeast corner of the hidden foot is revealed and visible for visitors.

=== The story of Prince Siddhartha and the birth of Buddha (Lalitavistara) ===
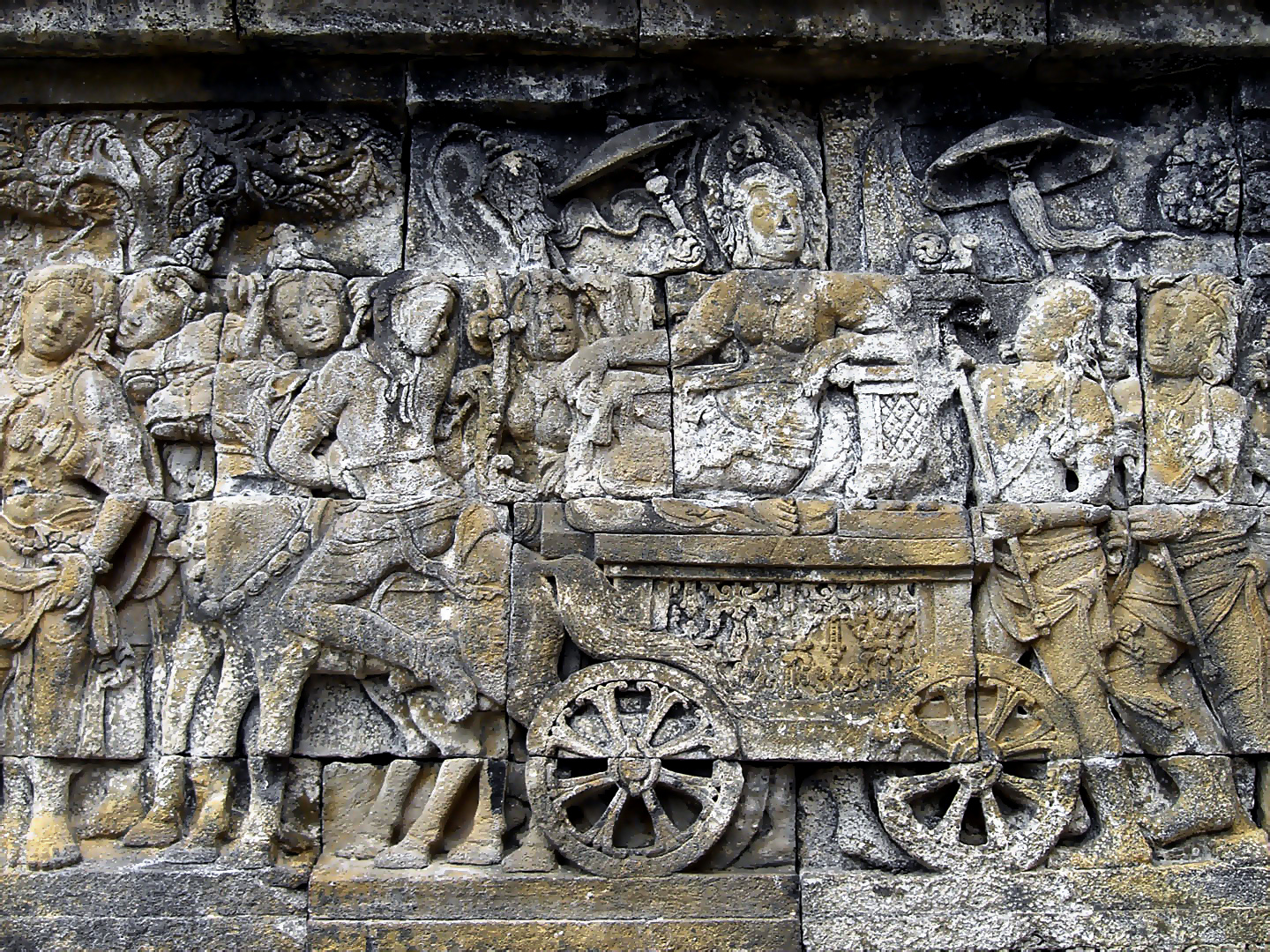
Queen Maya on a horse carriage going to Lumbini to give birth to Prince Siddhartha Gautama

The story starts with the descent of the Buddha from the Tushita heaven and ends with his first sermon in the Deer Park at Sarnath. The relief shows the birth of the Buddha as Prince Siddhartha, son of King Suddhodana and Queen Maya of Kapilavastu.

The birth is preceded by 27 panels showing various preparations, in the heavens and on the earth, to welcome the final incarnation of the bodhisattva. Before descending from Tushita heaven, the Bodhisattva entrusted his crown to his successor, the future Buddha Maitreya. He descended on earth in the shape of a white elephant with six tusks, and penetrated to Queen Maya's right womb. Queen Maya had a dream of this event, which was interpreted that her son would become either a sovereign or a Buddha.

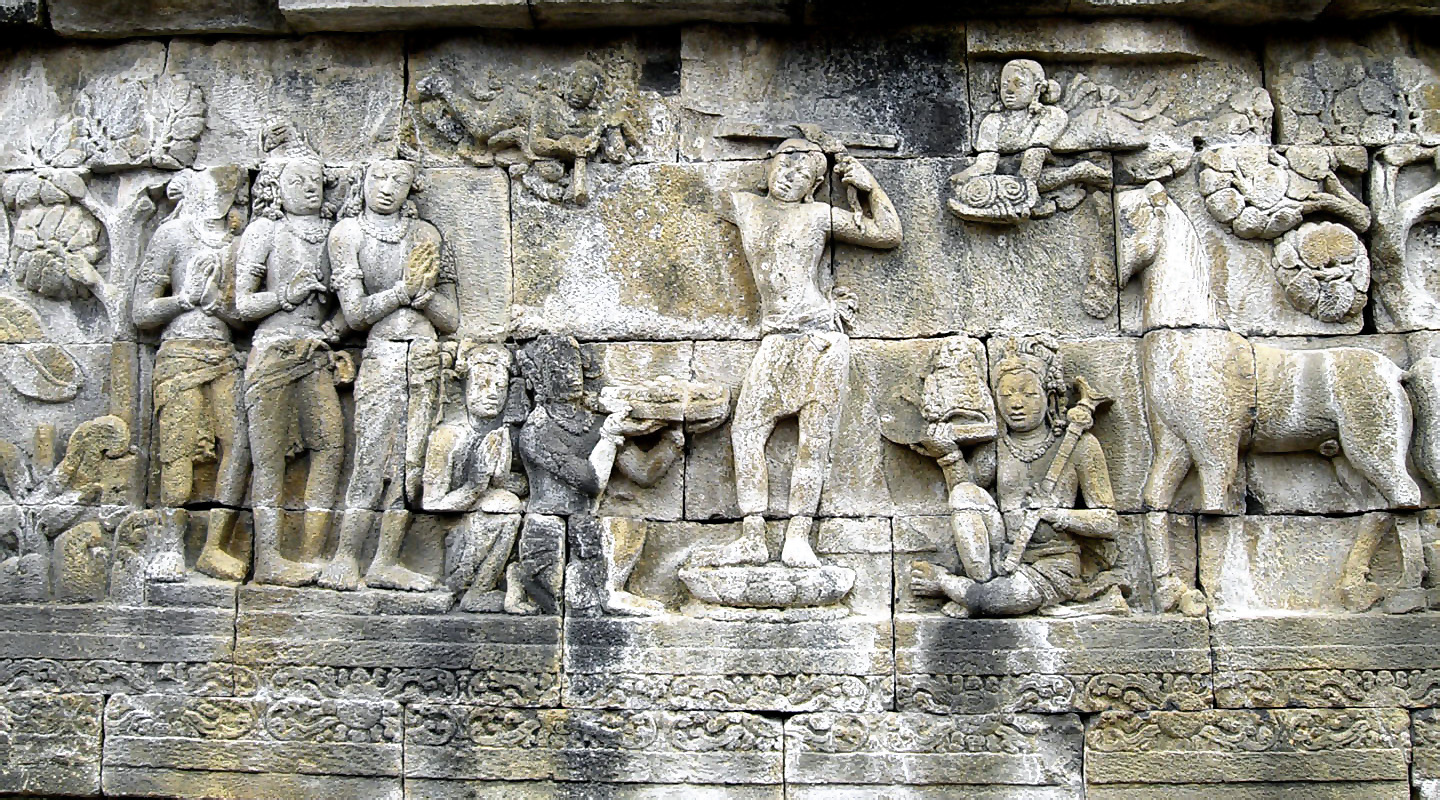
Siddhartha Gautama cuts off his hair to become an ascetic.

While Queen Maya felt that it was the time to give birth, she went to the Lumbini park near Kapilavastu. She stood under a sal tree (Shorea robusta), holding one branch with her right hand, and she gave birth to a son, Prince Siddhartha, from her side. The story on the panels continues until the Sermon in the Deer Park at Sarnath, his first sermon after his Enlightenment.

=== The stories of Buddha's previous life (Jataka) and other legendary people (Avadana) ===
Jatakas are stories about the Buddha before he was born as Prince Siddhartha. They are the stories that tell about the previous lives of the Buddha, in both human and animal form. The future Buddha may appear in them as a king, an outcast, a god, an elephant—but, in whatever form, he exhibits some virtue that the tale thereby inculcates. Avadanas are similar to jatakas, but the main figure is not the Bodhisattva himself. The saintly deeds in avadanas are attributed to other legendary persons. Jatakas and avadanas are treated in one and the same series in the reliefs of Borobudur.

The first twenty lower panels in the first gallery on the wall depict the Sudhanakumaravadana, or the saintly deeds of Sudhana. The first 135 upper panels in the same gallery on the balustrades are devoted to the 34 legends of the Jatakamala. The remaining 237 panels depict stories from other sources, as do the lower series and panels in the second gallery. Some jatakas are depicted twice, for example the story of King Sibhi (Rama's forefather).

=== Sudhana's search for the ultimate truth (Gandavyuha) ===
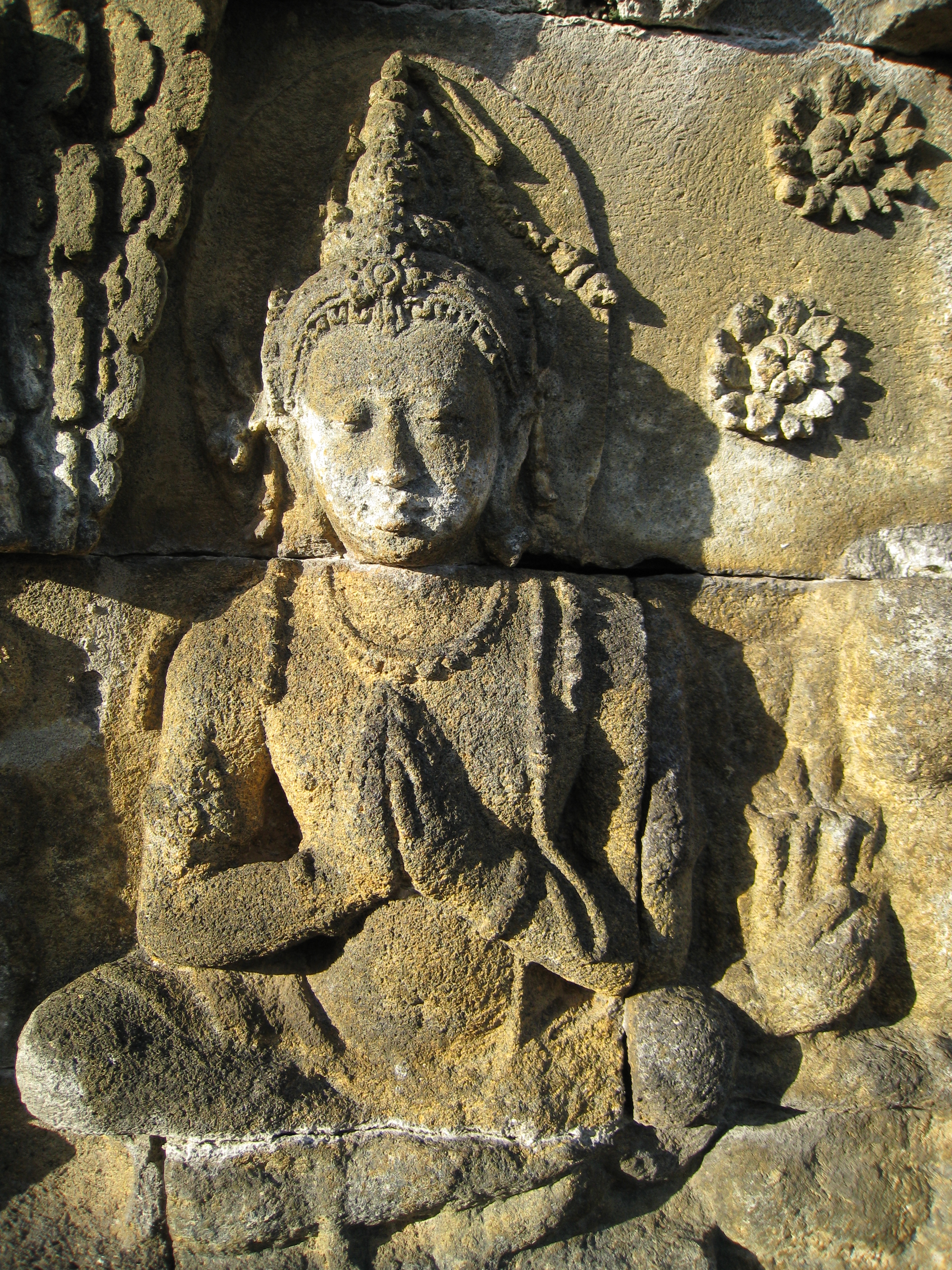
A relief of the Gandavyuha story from Borobudur 2nd level north wall

Gandavyuha is the story told in the final chapter of the Avatamsaka Sutra about the boy Sudhana's tireless wandering in search of the Highest Perfect Wisdom. It covers two galleries (third and fourth) and also half of the second gallery, comprising in total of 460 panels. The principal figure of the story, the youth Sudhana, son of a rich merchant, appears on the 16th panel. The preceding 15 panels form a prologue to the story of the miracles during Shakyamuni Buddha's samadhi in the Garden of Jeta at Sravasti.

Sudhana was instructed by Manjusri to meet the monk Megasri, his first spiritual friend and teacher. As his journey continues, Sudhana meets 53 teachers, such as Supratisthita, the physician Megha (Spirit of Knowledge), the banker Muktaka, the monk Saradhvaja, the female lay follower Asa (Spirit of Supreme Enlightenment), Bhismottaranirghosa, the Brahmin Jayosmayatna, Princess Maitrayani, the monk Sudarsana, a boy called Indriyesvara, the upasika Prabhuta, the banker Ratnachuda, King Anala, the god Siva Mahadeva, Queen Maya, Bodhisattva Maitreya and then back to Manjusri. Each spiritual friend gives Sudhana specific teachings, knowledge, and wisdom. These meetings are shown in the third gallery.

After a second meeting with Manjusri, Sudhana went to the residence of Bodhisattva Samantabhadra, depicted in the fourth gallery. The entire series of the fourth gallery is devoted to the teaching of Samantabhadra. The narrative panels finally end with Sudhana's achievement of the Supreme Knowledge and the Ultimate Truth.

== Buddha statues ==
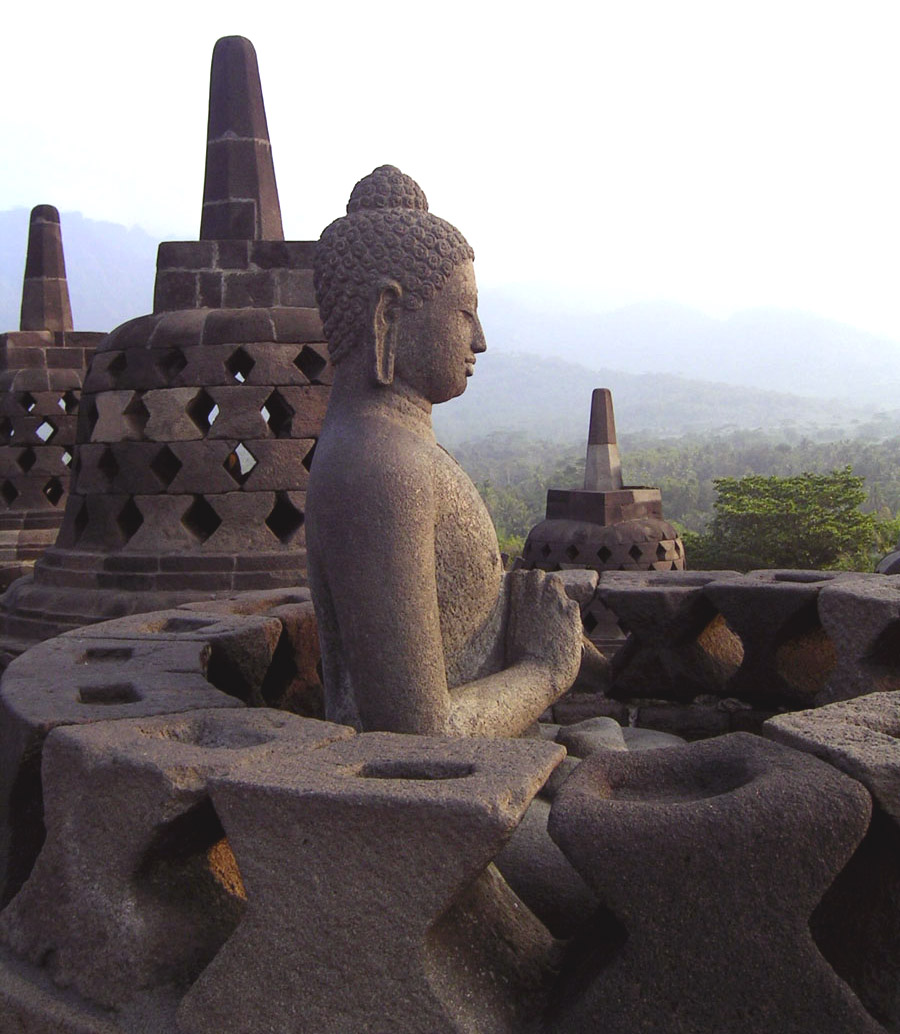
Buddha statue with dharmachakra mudra hand position

Apart from the story of the Buddhist cosmology carved in stone, Borobudur has many statues of various Buddhas. The cross-legged statues are seated in a lotus position and distributed on the five square platforms (the Rupadhatu level), as well as on the top platform (the Arupadhatu level).

The Buddha statues are in niches at the Rupadhatu level, arranged in rows on the outer sides of the balustrades, the number of statues decreasing as platforms progressively diminish to the upper level. The first balustrades have 104 niches, the second 104, the third 88, the fourth 72 and the fifth 64. In total, there are 432 Buddha statues at the Rupadhatu level. At the Arupadhatu level (or the three circular platforms), Buddha statues are placed inside perforated stupas. The first circular platform has 32 stupas, the second 24 and the third 16, which adds up to 72 stupas.

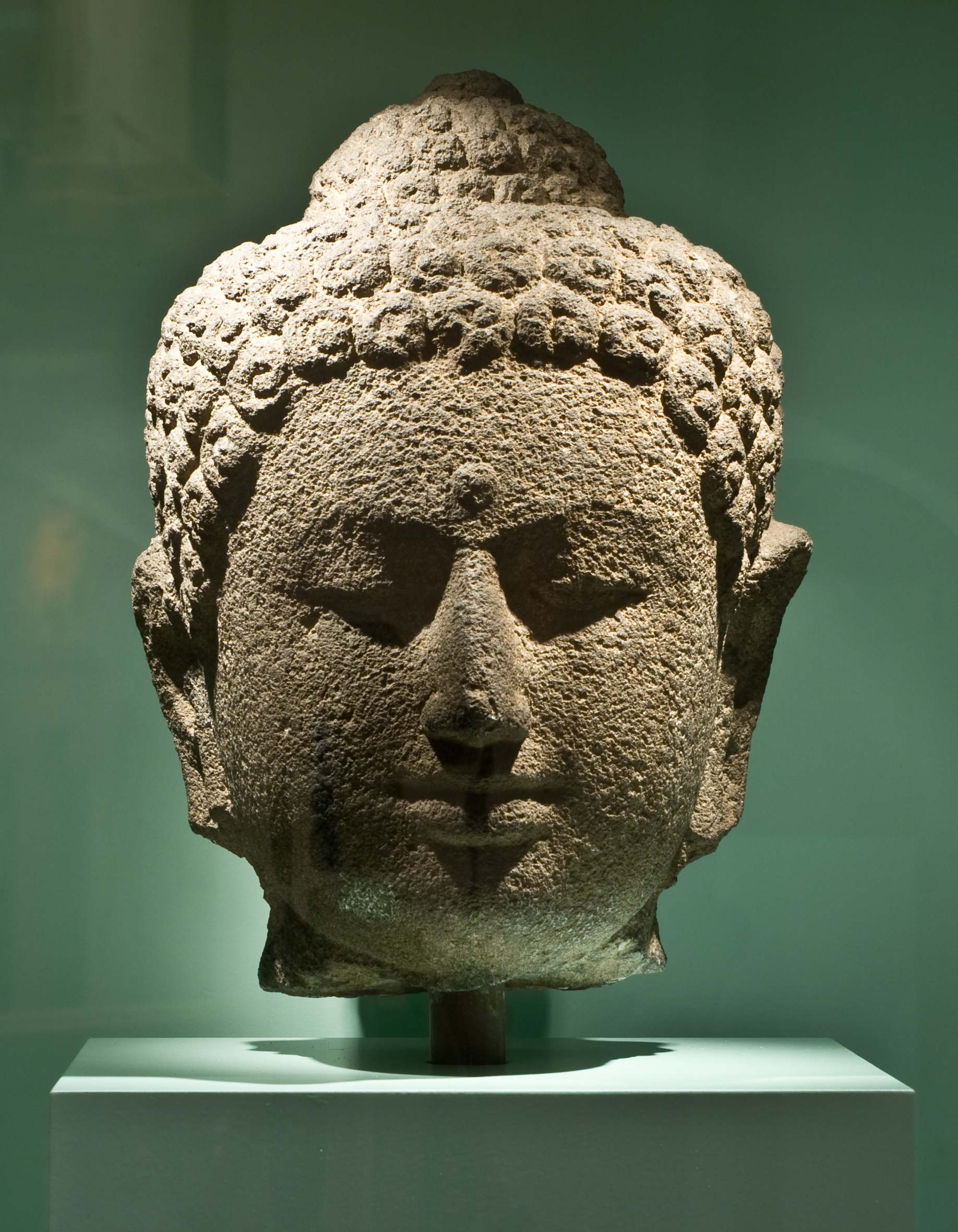
Head from a Borobudur Buddha statue in Tropenmuseum, Amsterdam

Of the original 504 buddha statues, over 300 are damaged (mostly headless), and 43 are missing. Since the monument's discovery, heads have been acquired by museums (mostly Western) or looted by personal collectors. Some of these Buddha heads are now displayed in numbers of museums, such as the Tropenmuseum in Amsterdam, Musée Guimet in Paris, and The British Museum in London. Germany has in 2014 returned its collection and funded their reattachment and further conservation of the site.

At first glance, all the Buddha statues appear similar, but there is a subtle difference between them in the mudras, or the position of the hands. There are five groups of mudra: North, East, South, West and Zenith, which represent the five cardinal compass points according to Mahayana. The buddha statues on the first four balustrades have the first four mudras: North, East, South and West, of which the Buddha statues that face one compass direction have the corresponding mudra. Buddha statues at the fifth balustrades have the vitarka mudra and the buddhas inside the 72 stupas on the top platform have the same dharmachakra mudra. Each mudra represents one of the Five Dhyani Buddhas; each has its own symbolism.

Following the order of Pradakshina (clockwise circumumbulation) starting from the East, the mudras of the Borobudur buddha statues are:

Statue	Mudra	Symbolic meaning	Dhyani Buddha	Cardinal Point	Location of the Statue
	Bhumisparsa mudra	Calling the Earth to witness	Aksobhya	East	Rupadhatu niches on the first four eastern balustrades
	Vara mudra	Benevolence, alms giving	Ratnasambhava	South	Rupadhatu niches on the first four southern balustrades
	Dhyana mudra	Concentration and meditation	Amitabha	West	Rupadhatu niches on the first four western balustrades
	Abhaya mudra	Courage, fearlessness	Amoghasiddhi	North	Rupadhatu niches on the first four northern balustrades
	Vitarka mudra	Reasoning and virtue	Vairochana or Samantabhadra	Zenith	Rupadhatu niches in all directions on the fifth (uppermost) balustrade
	Dharmachakra mudra	Turning the Wheel of dharma (law)	Vairochana	Zenith	Arupadhatu in 72 perforated stupas on three rounded platforms

== Legacy ==
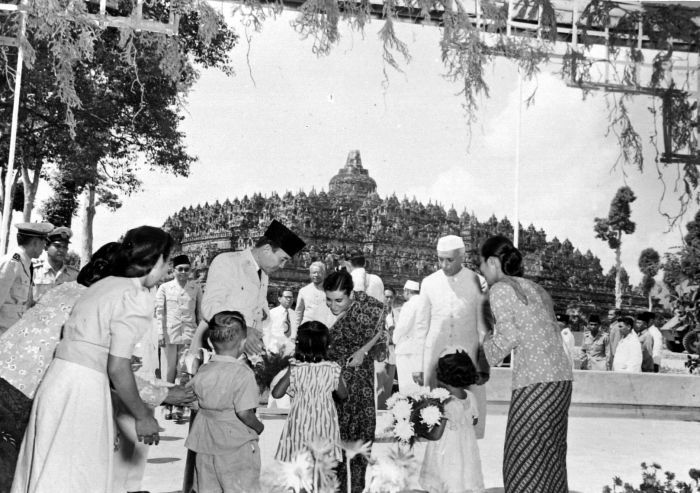
Sukarno and India's Prime Minister Jawaharlal Nehru visiting Borobudur in June 1950

The aesthetic and technical ideas of Borobudur, and also its sheer size, has evoked the sense of grandeur and pride for most Indonesians. Indonesia's first President Sukarno made a point of showing the site to foreign dignitaries. The Suharto regime realized its important, symbolic, and economic meanings embarked on a project to restore the monument with the help from UNESCO. Many museums in Indonesia contain a scale model replica of Borobudur. The monument has become almost a figure grouped with the wayang puppet play and gamelan music into a vague classical Javanese past from which Indonesians are to draw inspiration.

Several archaeological artifacts taken from Borobudur or its replica have been displayed in some museums in Indonesia and abroad. Other than Karmawibhangga Museum within Borobudur temple ground, some museums boast to host works of art from Borobudur, such as the Indonesian National Museum in Jakarta, Wereldmuseum Amsterdam, the British Museum, and the Bangkok National Museum. The Louvre, the Malaysian National Museum, and the Museum of World Religions in New Taipei also display replicas of Borobudur. The monument has drawn global attention to the classical Buddhist civilization of ancient Java.

The rediscovery and reconstruction of Borobudur has been hailed by Indonesian Buddhists as the sign of the Buddhist revival in Indonesia. In 1934, Narada Thera, a missionary monk from Sri Lanka, visited Indonesia for the first time as part of his journey to spread the Dharma in Southeast Asia. This opportunity was used by a few local Buddhists to revive Buddhism in Indonesia. A Bodhi Tree planting ceremony was held in Southeastern side of Borobudur on 10 March 1934 under the blessing of Narada Thera, and some Upasakas were ordained as monks. Once a year, thousands of Buddhist from Indonesia and neighboring countries flock to Borobudur to commemorate national Waisak celebration.

Emblem of Central Java displaying Borobudur

The emblem of Central Java province and Magelang Regency bears the image of Borobudur. It has become the symbol of Central Java, and also Indonesia on a wider scale. Borobudur has become the name of several establishments, such as Borobudur University, Borobudur Hotel in Central Jakarta, and several Indonesian restaurants abroad. The monument inspired the architectural designs of two notable five-star hotels in Indonesia: the nearby Amanjiwo (from where the temple can be seen on a clear day), and Hyatt Regency Yogyakarta in Sleman. Borobudur has appeared on Rupiah banknotes and stamps and in numbers of books, publications, documentaries and Indonesian tourism promotion materials. The monument has become one of the main tourism attraction in Indonesia, vital for generating local economy in the region surrounding the temple. The tourism sector of the city of Yogyakarta for example, flourishes partly because of its proximity to Borobudur and Prambanan temples.

=== In art and literature ===
In her poetical illustration Borro Boedoor., to an engraving of a painting by W. Purser in Fisher's Drawing Room Scrap Book, 1836, Letitia Elizabeth Landon reflects on Borobudur from a Christian perspective.

== See also ==
- Ancient monuments of Java
- Architecture of Indonesia
- Candi of Indonesia
- Chicken Church
- Borobudur Museum
- Kraton Ngayogyakarta Hadiningrat

== Works cited ==
=== Books ===
- Anom, I.G.N.; Sugiyanti, Sri; Hasibuan, Hadniwati (1996). Ibrahim, Maulana; Samidi (eds.). Hasil Pemugaran dan Temuan Benda Cagar Budaya PJP I (in Indonesian). Direktorat Jenderal Kebudayaan.
- Anom, I.G.N., ed. (2005). The Restoration of Borobudur. United Nations Educational, Scientific and Cultural Organization. ISBN 92-3-103940-7.
- Atmadi, Parmono (1988). Some Architectural Design Principles of Temples in Java: A study through the buildings projection on the reliefs of Borobudur temple. Yogyakarta: Gajah Mada University Press. ISBN 979-420-085-9.
- Bloembergen, Marieke; Eickhoff, Martijn (2015). Falser, M (ed.). Save Borobudur! The Moral Dynamics of Heritage Formation in Indonesia across Orders and Borders, 1930s–1980s. In Cultural Heritage as Civilizing Mission. Springer. pp. 83–119. ISBN 978-3-319-13637-0.
- Bloembergen, Marieke; Eickhoff, Martijn (2020). The Politics of Heritage in Indonesia A Cultural History. Cambridge University Press. ISBN 978-1-108-61475-7.
- Bucknell, Roderick S. & Stuart-Fox, Martin (1995). "Chapter 1: Meditation and Symbolism". The Twilight Language: Explorations in Buddhist Meditation and Symbolism. UK: Routledge. ISBN 0-7007-0234-2.
- Buswell, Robert E., ed. (2004). Encyclopedia of Buddhism. Macmillan Reference USA. ISBN 0-02-865718-7.
- Chemburkar, Swati (2016). Acri, Andrea (ed.). Borobudur's Pāla Forebear? A Field Note from Kesariya, Bihar, India. In Esoteric Buddhism in Mediaeval Maritime Asia; Networks of Masters, Texts, Icons. ISEAS–Yusof Ishak Institute. pp. 191–210. ISBN 9789814695091.
- De Casparis, Johannes Gijsbertu (1966). Malalasekera, G. P. (ed.). Barabudur, in: Encyclopedia of Buddhism, volume II. The Government of Ceylon. pp. 545–549.
- Cirtek, Peter (2019). Borobudur. Appearance of a Universe (2nd ed.). Hamburg: Monsun Verlag. ISBN 978-3-940429-09-4.
- Dumarçay, Jacques (1986). Borobudur. trans. and ed. by Michael Smithies (1st ed.). Singapore: Oxford University Press. ISBN 0-19-580379-5.
- Dumarçay, Jacques (1991). Borobudur. trans. and ed. by Michael Smithies (2nd ed.). Singapore: Oxford University Press. ISBN 0-19-588550-3.
- Dumarçay, Jacques (2005). Construction Techniques in South and Southeast Asia, A History. trans. by Barbara Silverstone, Raphaelle Dedourge. Leiden: Brill. ISBN 90-04-14126-X.
- Ferschin, Peter & Gramelhofer, Andreas (2004). "Architecture as Information Space". 8th Int. Conf. on Information Visualization. IEEE. pp. 181–186. doi:10.1109/IV.2004.1320142. ISBN 0-7695-2177-0.
- Fontein, Jan (1967). The pilgrimage of Sudhana : a study of Gandavyuha illustrations in China, Japan and Java. Mouton & Co. ISBN 978-3-11-156269-8.
- Fontein, Jan (2012). Entering the Dharmadhātu, A Study of the Gandavyūha Reliefs of Borobudur. Brill. ISBN 978-90-04-22348-6.
- Gómez, Luis O. & Woodward, Hiram W., eds. (1981). Barabudur: History and Significance of a Buddhist Monument. Berkeley: University of California. ISBN 0-89581-151-0.

- De Casparis, Johannes Gijsbertu (1981). "The Dual Nature of Barabudur". Barabudur: History and Significance of a Buddhist Monument.
- Wayman, Alex (1981). "Reflections on the Theory of Barabudur as a Mandala". Barabudur History and Significance of a Buddhist Monument. pp. 139–172.

- Haddon, A. C. (1920). The Outriggers of Indonesian Canoes (PDF). London: Royal Anthropological Institute of Ireland and Great Britain. OCLC 222264503.
- Haryono, Timbul (2011). Sendratari mahakarya Borobudur (in Indonesian). Kepustakaan Populer Gramedia. ISBN 978-979-9103-33-8.
- Hitchcock, Michael; Darma Putra, I. Nyoman (2016). "Prambanan and Borobudur: Managing tourism and conservation in Indonesia" (PDF). In King, Victor T. (ed.). UNESCO in Southeast Asia World Heritage Sites in Comparative Perspective. NIAS Press. pp. 258–273. ISBN 978-87-7694-667-8 – via Goldsmiths, University of London.
- Jordaan, Roy E. (1993). Imagine Buddha in Prambanan: Reconsidering the Buddhist Background of the Loro Jonggrang Temple Complex. Vakgroep Talen en Culturen van Zuidoost-Azië en Ocenanië, Rijksuniversiteit te Leiden. ISBN 90-73084-08-3.
- Kempers, Bernet (1976). Ageless Borobudur: Buddhist mystery in stone, decay and restoration, Mendut and Pawon, folklife in ancient Java. Wassenaar: Servire. ISBN 90-6077-553-8. OCLC 66207713.
- Krom, N.J. (1927). Borobudur, Archaeological Description, vol. I. The Hague: Nijhoff. OCLC 5964215.
- Landon, Letitia Elizabeth (1836). "picture". Fisher's Drawing Room Scrap Book. Fisher, Son & Co. OCLC 832519854.
- Miksic, John (1990). Borobudur: Golden Tales of the Buddhas. Tuttle Publishing. ISBN 0-87773-906-4.
- Miksic, John; Tranchini, Marcello; Tranchini, Anita (1996). Borobudur: Golden Tales of the Buddhas. Tuttle publishing. ISBN 978-0-945971-90-0.
- Munoz, Paul Michel (2007). Early Kingdoms of the Indonesian Archipelago and the Malay Peninsula. Didier Millet. ISBN 978-981-4155-67-0.
- Nagaoka, M (2016). Cultural Landscape Management at Borobudur, Indonesia. Springer. ISBN 978-3-319-42045-5.
- Raffles, Thomas Stamford [1830] (2015). The History of Java, v. 1-2, 2nd, John Murray. OCLC 578699780. Retrieved on 22 December 2023 at Project Gutenberg
- Revianur, A. (2018). Budianta, Melani; Budiman, Manneke; Kusno, Abidin; Moriyama, Mikihiro (eds.). Forms and types of Borobudur's stupas. In Cultural Dynamics in a Globalized World. Taylor & Francis. pp. 577–584. ISBN 978-1-138-62664-5.
- Soekmono, Raden (1976). Chandi Borobudur: A Monument of Mankind (PDF). Paris: Unesco Press. ISBN 92-3-101292-4.
- Soekmono, Raden (1981) [1973]. Pengantar Sejarah Kebudayaan Indonesia 2 (PDF) (3rd ed.). Yogyakarta: Penerbit Kanisius – via Yogyakarta State University.
- Vaisutis, Justine (2007). Indonesia. Lonely Planet. ISBN 978-1-74104-435-5.
- Voûte, Caesar & Long, Mark (2008). Borobudur: Pyramid of the Cosmic Buddha. D.K. Printworld Ltd. ISBN 978-8-12460-403-8. OCLC 229446531. Archived from the original on 8 June 2008 – via borobudur.tv.
- Wood, Michael (2011). "Chapter 2: Archaeology, National Histories, and National Borders in Southeast Asia". In Clad, James; McDonald, Sean M.; Vaughan, Bruce (eds.). The Borderlands of Southeast Asia. NDU Press. ISBN 978-1-78039-922-5.

=== Journal articles ===
- Berger, Sebastien (30 May 2006). "An ancient wonder reduced to rubble". The Sydney Morning Herald.
- Bloembergen, M.; Monquil, M. (2022). "A fragmented Provenance Report regarding Four Buddha heads gifted by Artis in the NMVW and the social lives of Borobudur" (PDF). PPROCE Provenance Reports. 36. Koninklijke Nederlandse Akademie van Wetenschappen.
- Crouch, Harold (2002). "The Key Determinants of Indonesia's Political Future". Trends in Southeast Asia. 7. ISSN 0219-3213.
- De Casparis, J.G. (1992). "Review of The law of cause and effect in ancient Java, by J. Fontein". Bijdragen tot de Taal-, Land- en Volkenkunde. 148 (1): 148–151. JSTOR 27864315.
- Hall, D.G.E. (1956). "Problems of Indonesian Historiography". Pacific Affairs. 38 (3/4): 353–359. doi:10.2307/2754037. JSTOR 2754037.
- Hampton, Mark P. (2005). "Heritage, Local Communities and Economic Development". Annals of Tourism Research. 32 (3): 735–759. doi:10.1016/j.annals.2004.10.010. S2CID 154890055.
- Van Lohuizen-de Leeuw, J.E. (1965). "The Dhyani-Buddhas of Barabudur". Bijdragen tot de Taal-, Land- en Volkenkunde / Journal of the Humanities and Social Sciences of Southeast Asia. 121 (4): 389–416. doi:10.1163/22134379-90002949.
- Moens, J. L. (1951). "Barabudur, Mendut en Pawon en hun onderlinge samenhang" [Barabudur, Mendut and Pawon and their mutual relationship] (PDF). Tijdschrift voor de Indische Taai-, Land- en Volkenkunde deel LXXXIV, aflevering 3, jaarg. P.[326]-386. trans. by Mark Long. Het Bataviaasch Genootschap van Kunsten en Wetenschappen: 1–109. OCLC 69201320. Archived from the original (PDF) on 10 August 2007.
- Murwanto, H.; Gunnell, Y; Suharsono, S.; Sutikno, S.; Lavigne, F. (2004). "Borobudur monument (Java, Indonesia) stood by a natural lake: chronostratigraphic evidence and historical implications". The Holocene. 14 (3): 459–463. Bibcode:2004Holoc..14..459M. doi:10.1191/0959683604hl721rr. S2CID 129690872.
- Nastiti, Titi Surti (2018). "RE-INTERPRETASI NAMA CANDI BOROBUDUR". AMERTA (in Indonesian). 36 (1): 11–22. ISSN 2549-8908.
- Santiko, Hariani (2016). "Identification of Karmawibbanga Reliefs at Candi Borobudur". AMERTA, Jurnal Penelitian Dan Pengembangan Arkeologi. 34 (2): 129–137. doi:10.24832/amt.v34i2.179.
- Situngkir, H. (2010). "Borobudur Was Built Algorithmically". BFI Working Paper Series WP-9-2010. Bandung Fe Institute: 1–9. SSRN 1672522.
- Troll, Valentin R.; Deegan, Frances M.; Jolis, Ester M.; Budd, David A.; Dahren, Börje; Schwarzkopf, Lothar M. (1 March 2015). "Ancient oral tradition describes volcano–earthquake interaction at merapi volcano, indonesia". Geografiska Annaler. Series A, Physical Geography. 97 (1): 137–166. Bibcode:2015GeAnA..97..137T. doi:10.1111/geoa.12099. ISSN 0435-3676. S2CID 129186824.
- "Agreement concerning the voluntary contributions to be given for the execution of the project to preserve Borobudur" (PDF). United Nations Treaty Series. 865 (1973): 12414–12422. 1980.
- Van der Meulen, W. J. (1977). "In Search of "Ho-Ling"". Indonesia. 23 (23): 87–112. doi:10.2307/3350886. hdl:1813/53640. JSTOR 3350886. Archived from the original on 4 October 2008.
- Van der Meulen, W. J. (1979). "King Sañjaya and His Successors". Indonesia. 28 (28): 17–54. doi:10.2307/3350894. hdl:1813/53687. JSTOR 3350894. Archived from the original on 21 October 2008.
- Vogel, J. Ph. (1913). "The Borobudur Restored". Journal of the Royal Asiatic Society. 45 (2): 421–422. doi:10.1017/S0035869X00044798. S2CID 163589816.
- Voute, Caesar (1973). "The Restoration and Conservation Project of Borobudur Temple, Indonesia. Planning: Research: Design". Studies in Conservation. 18 (3): 113–130. doi:10.2307/1505654. JSTOR 1505654.
- Woodward, Hiram W. Jr. (1979). "Acquisition". Critical Inquiry. 6 (2): 291–303. doi:10.1086/448048. S2CID 224792217.
- Zin, Monika (2014). "Imagery of Hell in South, South East and Central Asia". Rocznik Orientalistyczny. LXVII (1): 269–296. ISSN 0080-3545.

=== Newspaper and online sources ===
- "Covered in volcanic ash, Borobudur closed temporarily". Antara. 6 November 2010. Archived from the original on 9 November 2010.
- "Candi Borobudur dicatatkan di Guinness World Records" (in Indonesian). Antara. 5 July 2012. Archived from the original on 9 July 2012.
- Antara (11 October 2023). "Borobudur Temple: Govt targets 2 mln visitors per year".
- Asdhiana, I Made (6 March 2015). "Tangga Candi Borobudur Dilapisi Karet". Kompas.com (in Indonesian).
- "Borobudur Buddha head". BBC. "A History of The World, The British Museum"
- "Figure of Buddha head; globular head and full rounded features. Made of volcanic stone". British Museum.
- "Buddhism in Indonesia". Buddhanet. 2002. Archived from the original on 14 February 2002.
- "Borobudur". Buddhist Travel. 2008. Archived from the original on 5 January 2012.
- "Pangguyangan". Dinas Pariwisata dan Budaya Provinsi Jawa Barat (in Indonesian). Archived from the original on 24 December 2019.
- "Jataka". Encyclopædia Britannica.
- Fitriana, Ika (19 November 2014). "Tangga Candi Borobudur Mulai Dilapisi Kayu". Kompas.com (in Indonesian).
- Fitriana, Ika (4 June 2023). "Saat Ribuan Lampion Waisak Diterbangkan di Langit Borobudur". Kompas.com (in Indonesian).
- "Largest Buddhist temple". Guinness World Records. Guinness World Records.
- "Borobudur". Indonesian Embassy in The Hague (in Indonesian). 21 December 2012. Archived from the original on 6 November 2014.
- "Borobudur Pernah Salah Desain". Kompas.com (in Indonesian). 7 April 2000. Archived from the original on 26 December 2007.
- "Saving Borobudur". PBS. Archived from the original on 31 May 2000.
- Madyansyah, Muhammad Marjan (22 July 2023). "Pradaksina, Ribuan Umat Buddha Enam Negara Mengitari Borobudur". kemenag.go.id (in Indonesian). Kementerian Agama.
- Muryanto, Bambang (20 November 2014). "Buddhas to be reunited with their heads". The Jakarta Post.
- "The Greatest Sacred Buildings". Museum of World Religions, Taipei. Archived from the original on 7 February 2017.
- Naibaho, Juang (7 November 2010). "Inilah Foto-foto Kerusakan Candi" (in Indonesian). Tribun News.
- Republic of Indonesia (2002). "Periodic Reporting Exercise on the Application of the World Heritage Convention, State of Conservation of the World Heritage Properties in the Asia-Pacific Region Section II, Borobudur Temple" (PDF). whc.unesco.org. UNESCO. pp. 1–26. Archived from the original (PDF) on 11 January 2012.
- Sudiarno, Tarko (25 May 2016). "Photo: Waisak prayers, processions in pursuit of enlightenment". The Jakarta Post.
- Tartakov, Gary Michael. "Lecture 17: Sherman Lee's History of Far Eastern Art (Indonesia and Cambodja)". Lecture notes for Asian Art and Architecture: Art & Design 382/582. Iowa State University. Archived from the original on 27 April 2002.
- "The Borobudur Ship Expedition, Indonesia to Africa 2003–2004". The Borobudur Ship Expedition. 2003. Archived from the original on 17 February 2003.
- "Borobudur Temple Forced to Close While Workers Remove Merapi Ash". The Jakarta Globe. 7 November 2010. Archived from the original on 11 November 2010.
- "Germany Supports Safeguarding of Borobudur". The Jakarta Globe. 12 June 2012. Archived from the original on 15 June 2012.
- "Borobudur, Other Sites, Closed After Mount Kelud Eruption". The Jakarta Globe. 14 February 2014. Archived from the original on 14 February 2014.
- "Borobudur's post-Merapi eruption rehabilitating may take three years: Official". The Jakarta Post. 17 February 2011. Archived from the original on 16 January 2016.
- "UI archaeology professor weighs in on Borobudur's 'chattra' restoration". The Jakarta Post. 20 January 2018.
- The Straits Times (23 August 2014). "Indonesia's police on alert over apparent ISIS terror threat to Borobudur Temple".
- "1,100-Year-Old Buddhist Temple Wrecked By Bombs in Indonesia". The Miami Herald. 22 January 1985.
- "Cultural heritage and partnership" (PDF) (programme and meeting document). UNESCO. 1999.
- "UNESCO experts mission to Prambanan and Borobudur Heritage Sites" (Press release). UNESCO. 31 August 2004.
- "Borobudur Temple Compounds". UNESCO World Heritage Centre. UNESCO. 2024.
- "Stone Conservation Workshop, Borobudur, Central Java, Indonesia, 11-12 January 2012 funded by the Federal Republic of Germany". UNESCO Jakarta. 16 January 2012. Archived from the original on 14 September 2017.
- Wahyuni, Sri (28 June 2011). "Borobudur clean-up to finish in November". The Jakarta Post.
- "Candi Borobudur, Bentuk dan Perlambang". Wacana Nusantara. 23 September 2015. Archived from the original on 5 March 2016.
- "Borobudur: Candi Berbukit Kebajikan". Walubi. 2023. Archived from the original on 3 July 2010.
- "The Meaning of Procession". Waisak. Walubi (Buddhist Council of Indonesia). Archived from the original on 11 February 2009.
- Watson, Penny (19 December 2023). "How world's largest Buddhist temple in Indonesia has been reborn". Bangkok Post.
- Wiener, James Blake (21 September 2018). "Borobudur". World History Encyclopedia.
- "Vesak Festival: A Truly Sacred Experience". Wonderful Indonesia. 2013. Archived from the original on 4 May 2015.
