= Chicken Church =

Chicken Church may refer to:

- Gereja Ayam, prayer house in Indonesia
- The Church by the Sea in Madeira Beach, Florida
