= Tri Tepusan inscription =

Inscription from Central Java, Indonesia

The Tri Tepusan inscription is an inscription discovered in Kedu Plain, Temanggung Regency, Central Java, Indonesia, dated from 842 CE. This inscription is linked with the Borobudur Buddhist monument.

== Contents ==
The inscription mentioned the sima (tax-free) lands in Tri Tepusan village awarded by Çrī Kahulunnan (Pramodhawardhani) to ensure the funding and maintenance of a Kamūlān called Bhūmisambhāra. Kamūlān itself from the word mula which means 'the place of origin', a sacred building to honor the ancestors, probably the ancestors of the Sailendras. Casparis suggested that Bhūmi Sambhāra Bhudhāra which in Sanskrit means "The mountain of combined virtues of the ten stages of Boddhisattvahood", was the original name of Borobudur.

== See also ==
- Canggal inscription (732)
- Kalasan inscription (778)
- Kelurak inscription (782)
- Karangtengah inscription (824)
- Mantyasih inscription (907)
- Laguna Copperplate Inscription (900)
- Shivagrha inscription (856)
- Buddhism in Indonesia
- Candi of Indonesia
- Hinduism in Java
- Indonesian Esoteric Buddhism
