= Hiram W. Woodward =

American art historian

Hiram W. Woodward, Jr. is an American art historian who specialises in pre-modern Southeast Asian art.

After completing a B.A. in fine arts at Harvard College in 1962, Woodward joined the Peace Corps and taught English at Silpakorn University in Bangkok, Thailand. After three years, he returned to the United States in 1966 where he took an M.A. in Southeast Asian Studies at Yale University. From 1969 to 1972 he lived in Thailand again and traveled extensively through Southeast Asia. With a thesis on the Art of Central Siam, 950–1350 A.D. he completed his Ph.D., also at Yale, in 1975. From 1972 until 1982, Woodward taught as assistant professor of History of Art at the University of Michigan, Ann Arbor and subsequently until 1986 as associate professor at the University of Vermont. From 1986 to 2003 he served as the curator of Asian Art at the Walters Art Museum in Baltimore.

He has published mainly on Buddhist sculpture from Southeast Asia, as well as art and architecture in the area of present-day Thailand from prehistoric times until the inception of the Kingdom of Ayutthaya in the 14th century.

In 2013, the SOAS University of London created an endowed chair in Southeast Asian Art named after Hiram W. Woodward.

== Publications (selected) ==
- Editor with Luis O. Gómez: Barabudur: History and Significance of a Buddhist Monument. Asian Humanities Press. 1981.
- "Southeast Asian Traces of the Buddhist Pilgrims". MUSE: Annual of the Museum of Art and Archaeology. 22: 75–91. 1988.
- James R. Chamberlain, ed. (1991). Ram Khamhaeng's Inscription: The Search for Context. The Siam Society. pp. 419–437.
- The Sacred Sculpture of Thailand: The Alexander B. Griswold Collection. The Walters Art Gallery. 1997.
- The Art and Architecture of Thailand: from prehistoric times through the thirteenth century. Brill. 2003.
- Woodward, Hiram (2004). "Esoteric Buddhism in Southeast Asia in the Light of Recent Scholarship". Journal of Southeast Asian Studies. 35 (2): 329–354. doi:10.1017/S0022463404000177.
