= Gereja Ayam =

House of worship in Magelang, Indonesia

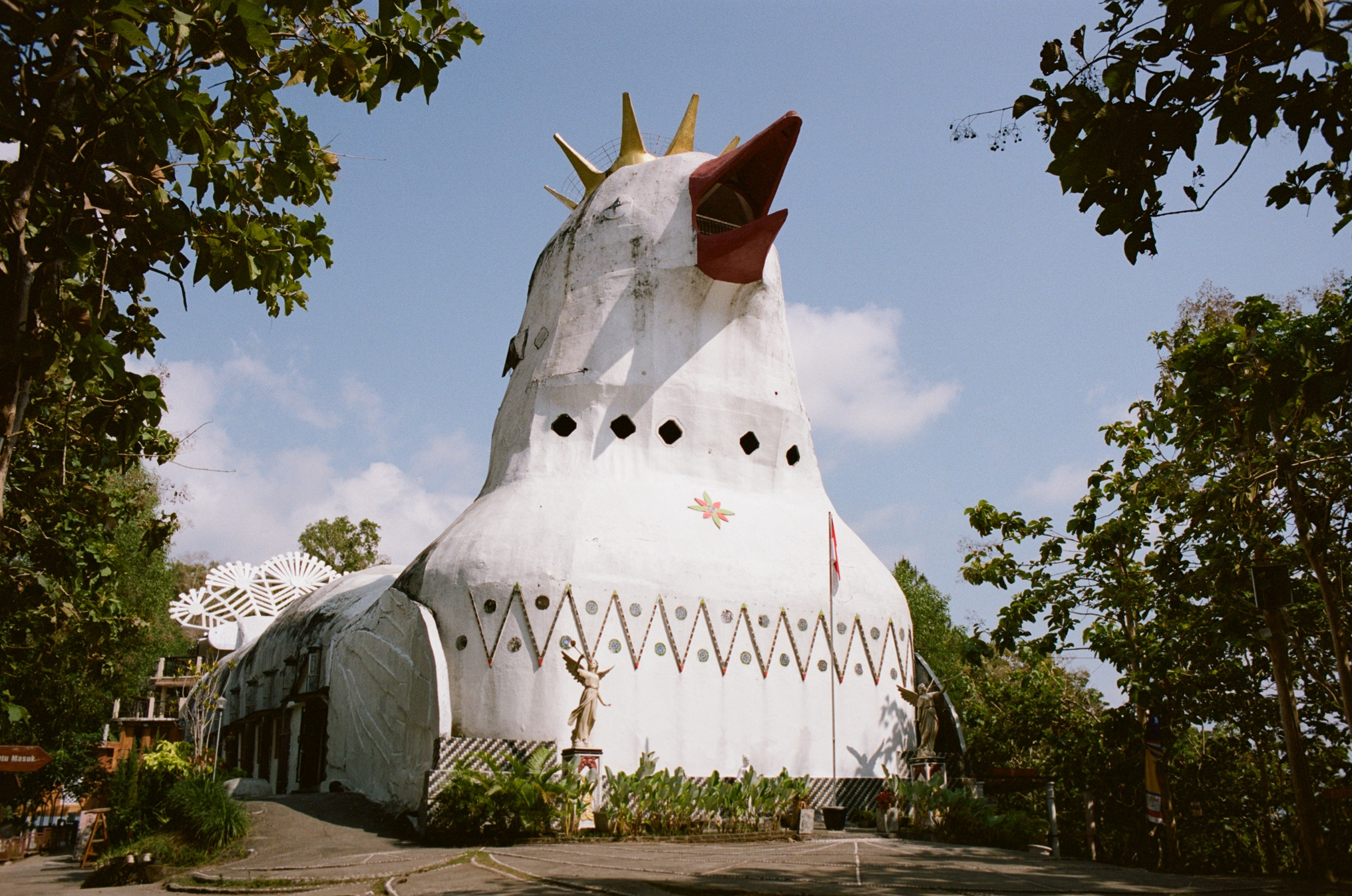
- Exterior view of Gereja Ayam
- Interactive map of the Gereja Ayam area

General information
- Status: Open to the public for tours and visitations
- Type: Prayer house
- Location: Karangrejo Gombong, Kurahan, Kembanglimus, Kec. Borobudur, Magelang Regency, Central Java 56553, Indonesia, Indonesia
- Coordinates: 7°36′20.5″S 110°10′49.8″E
- Construction started: c. 1990
- Completed: Incomplete, abandoned in 2000

Website
- Official website

Bukit Rhema, more commonly known by the nickname Gereja Ayam (Indonesian for 'Chicken Church'), is an abandoned house of worship in the Magelang area in Central Java, Indonesia. The nickname comes from the building's unique shape, which resembles a hen to most people who see it, although the builder intended it to look more like a dove.

== History ==
The building was erected during the 1990s by Daniel Alamsjah, who claimed to have been inspired by God to build a prayer house through a dream he had in 1989. Alamsjah is Christian, but he envisioned Gereja Ayam as a place to welcome followers of any religion for prayer or meditation.

Due to financial difficulties and local resistance, the construction was never finalised; it was halted in 2000, and the building has since largely been left to deteriorate. Despite this, in recent years, the place has become frequented by tourists as well as by couples seeking either to take wedding photographs or to be wed in the building. Following depictions of the site in several films over the past decade, the church has achieved a level of fame and is now a tourist attraction.

== Structure and amenities ==
Gereja Ayam contains a cafe in the chicken's rear as well as a souvenir shop.

Visitors can climb the stairs to the top of the structure and view the surrounding Central Java area. The world's largest Buddhist temple, Borobudur, can be seen at a distance of 4.7 km.

== In popular culture ==
The 2016 Werner Herzog documentary film Into the Inferno devotes a segment to Gereja Ayam.
