= Prambanan Temple Compounds =

Group of temples in Indonesia

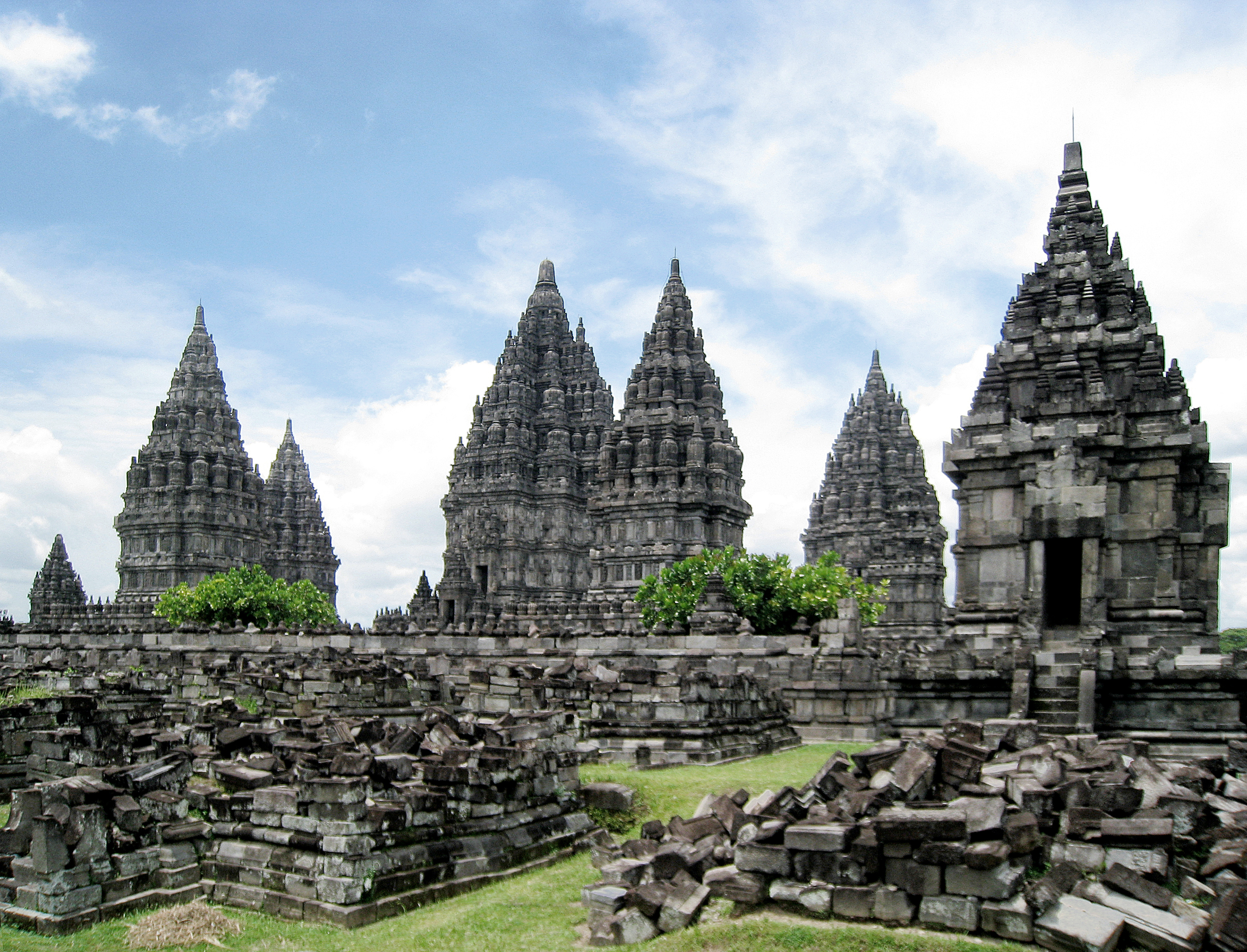
- Prambanan, 2010

- Location within Java Prambanan Temple Compounds (Indonesia)
- 7°45′8″S 110°29′30″E
- Location: Bokoharjo Village, Prambanan District, Sleman Regency, Special Region of Yogyakarta; and Bugisan Village, Prambanan District, Klaten Regency, Central Java

History
- Built: Circa 8th to 9th century CE

UNESCO World Heritage Site
- Type: Cultural
- Criteria: i, iv
- Designated: 1991 (15th session)
- Reference no.: 642
- Region: Southeast Asia

Prambanan Temple Compounds is the World Heritage designation of a group of Hindu temple compounds that lie on the border between Yogyakarta and Central Java, Indonesia. It comprises Prambanan, Lumbung, Bubrah and Sewu temple compounds, all are located within Prambanan Archaeological Park.

These temples are known locally as candi in Indonesian and Javanese languages. The temple compounds are located along Opak River valley within Prambanan Plain or Kewu Plain, an archaeologically rich area dotted with numerous Hindu temples dated from the 8th and 9th centuries CE, historically linked with the Mataram kingdom. The diversity and sophistication of the temple compounds and archaeological sites in this area are comparable to Angkor archaeological site in Cambodia.

== History ==
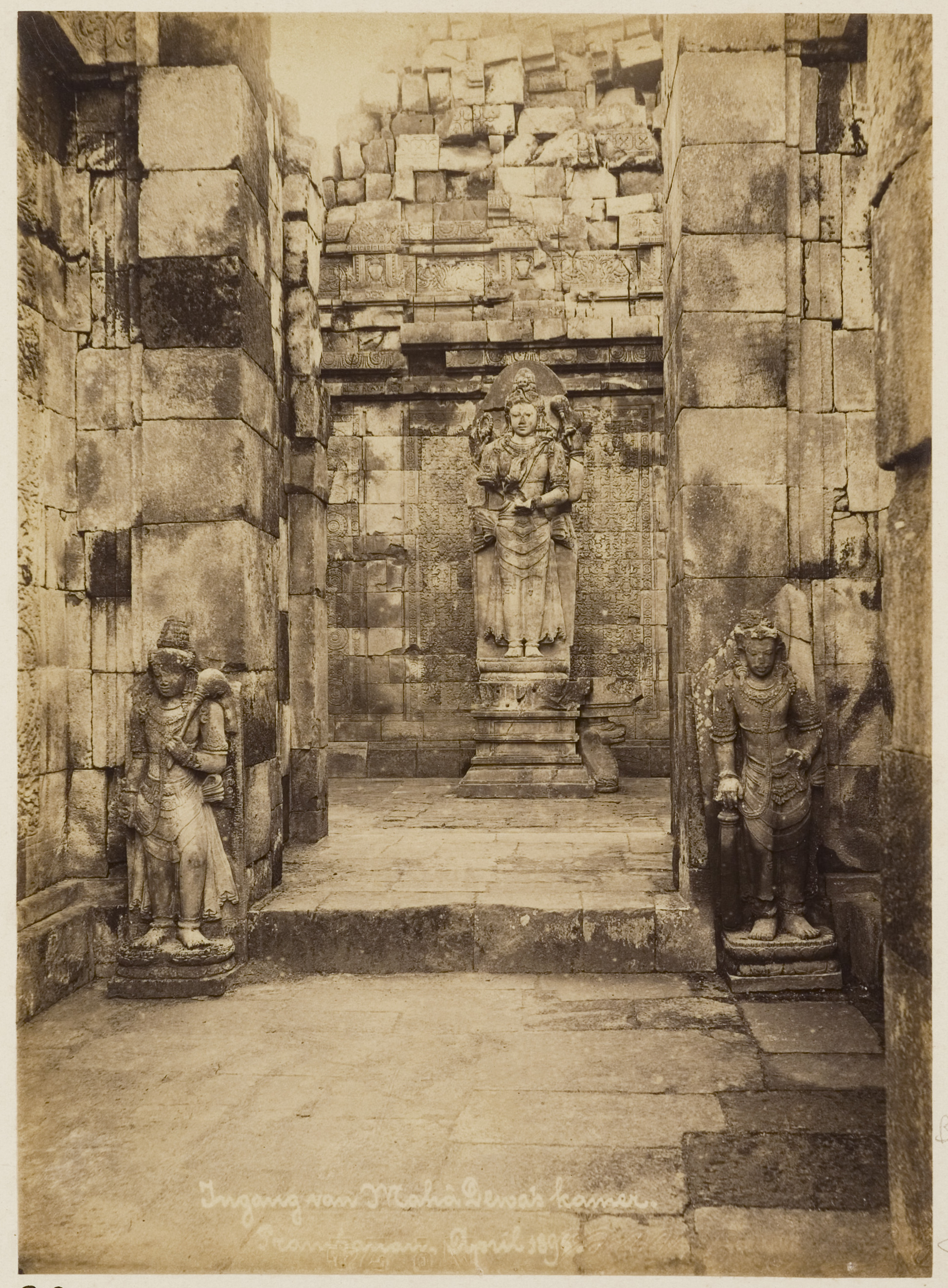
Statue of Shiva in the ruin of Prambanan main temple in 1895

The temple compounds date from the 8th to 9th century CE, linked with historic Mataram kingdom that ruled Central Java during that period. Shailendras, the ruling family of the kingdom were known as the avid temple builders. Indeed, some temples in the area, including Kalasan, Sari, and Sewu are credited to their second monarch King Panangkaran. Among these temple compounds, Sewu is the oldest, completed in 792 according to Manjusrigrha inscription. Lumbung and Bubrah also dated from around the same period or slightly later. Prambanan however, was the latest addition in the complex, finished and inaugurated in 856 during the reign of King Pikatan according to Shivagrha inscription.

After the move of the capital to eastern Java circa the 11th century, the temple was neglected. For centuries later, it fell into disrepair, buried under Mount Merapi volcanic debris and shaken by earthquakes. The temple collapsed around the 1600s due to a massive earthquake.

The temple was in ruins during its rediscovery back in early 19th century in the British Java period. In 1918, the Dutch colonial government began the reconstruction of the compound, and proper restoration took place in 1930 with modest result due to loss of the temple stones. Only a number of the smaller pervara shrines of Prambanan and Sewu complex were reconstructed during the Dutch East Indies period prior to the Pacific War.

After the World War II, the reconstruction efforts continues by implementing the anastylosis method, which means the temple will be reconstructed if only at least 75 percent of the original stones remains. The reconstruction of the main Shiva temple in Prambanan complex was completed around 1953 and inaugurated by Indonesia's first president Sukarno. Brahma temple reconstruction was finished in 1987, while Vishnu temple was completed in 1991, both were inaugurated by Suharto.

In 1991, the temple compounds gained UNESCO World Heritage Site status. The temple compounds are located within Prambanan Tourism Park (Indonesian: Taman Wisata Candi Prambanan). Sewu main temple was completed in 1993, while Bubrah restoration was completed in 2017. Since the temple compound consists of hundreds of pervara temples or complementary smaller shrines that most are still in ruins, restoration efforts still continue to this day.

== Temple compounds ==
Temples and archaeological sites in Prambanan Plain

Prambanan is a Hindu temple compound dedicated to Trimurti, the three highest gods in Hinduism, while Sewu, Lumbung and Bubrah temples are Mahayana Buddhist temples. Both Prambanan and Sewu are actually temple compounds arranged in the mandala layout, surrounded with hundreds of pervara (guardian complementary) temples. Originally, Prambanan consists of 240 structures, Sewu consists of 249 structures, while Lumbung temple consists of 17 structures. With combined numbers of over 500 temples, Prambanan Temple Compounds represents not only an architectural and cultural treasure, but also an example of religious harmony and peaceful cohabitation between faiths in Indonesia's past.

=== Prambanan ===
Prambanan temple or locally known in Javanese as Rara Jonggrang, is a grand Hindu temple complex dating from the 9th century, it is notable for its shrines and statues of Hindu patheon and Ramayana bas relief. Murtis or Hindu deity statues venerated in Prambanan complex including the main deity Shiva Mahadeva, Vishnu, Brahma, Durga Mahisasuramardini, Ganesha, Agastya, and Nandi bull.

=== Sewu ===
Sewu or originally known as Manjusrigrha complex, with its four pairs of Dvarapala giant statues, is the largest Buddhist temple complex in Indonesia, and the second largest Buddhist temple after Borobudur. Archaeologists believe the original name for the temple compound to be Manjusrigrha, which means "the house of Manjusri", one of the major Bodhisattva in Mahayana Buddhism belief.

=== Bubrah ===
Bubrah is a 9th-century Buddhist temple located between Lumbung in the south and Sewu in the north. Experts believe that the temple was designed as a part of the greater Sewu temple compound mandala.

=== Lumbung ===
Candi Lumbung a 9th-century Buddhist temple compound located within the complex of Prambanan Temple Tourism Park, Central Java, Indonesia. The original name of this temple is unknown, however the local Javanese named the temple "Candi Lumbung", which means "rice barn temple" in Javanese language.

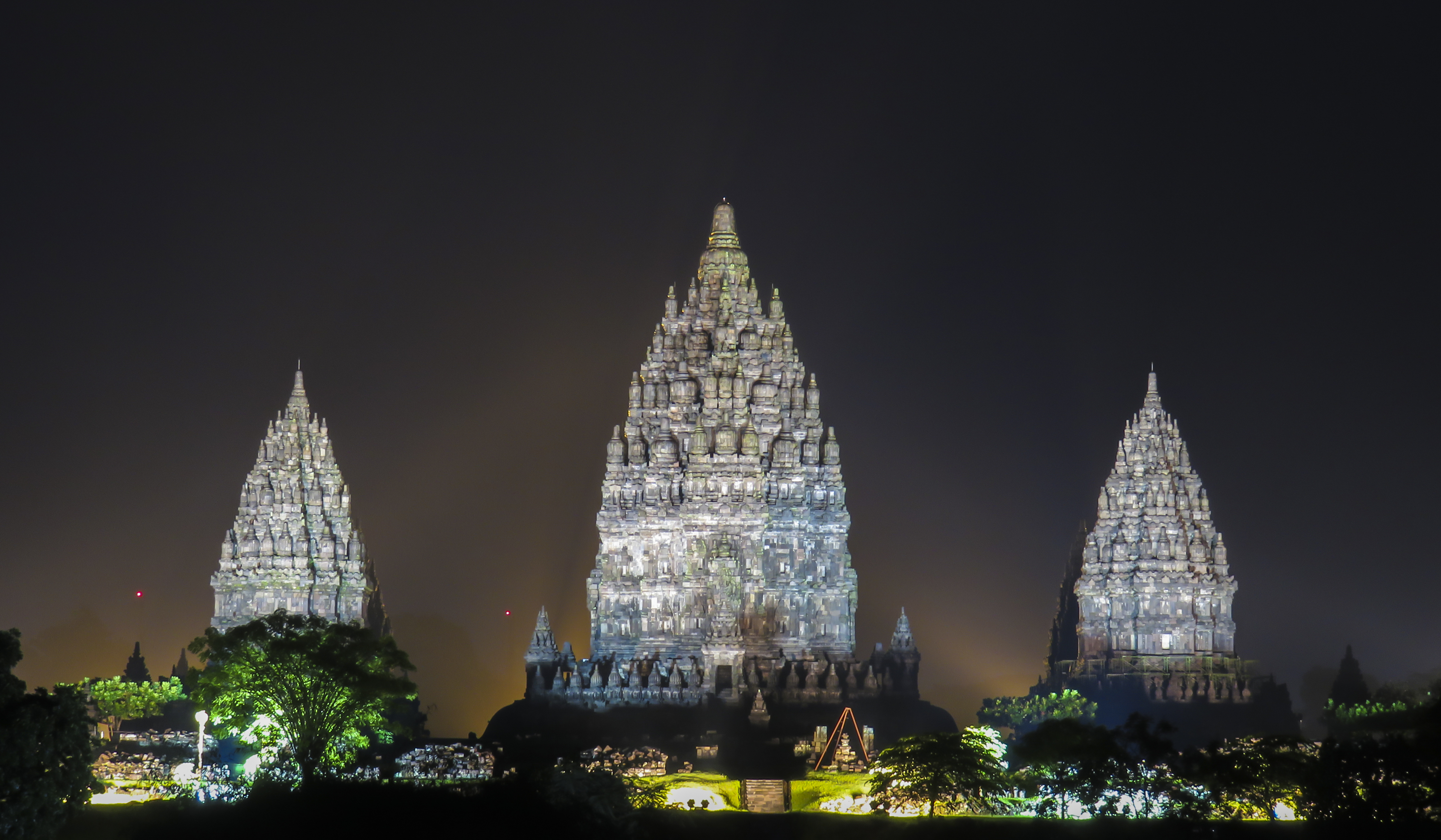
Prambanan temple compound

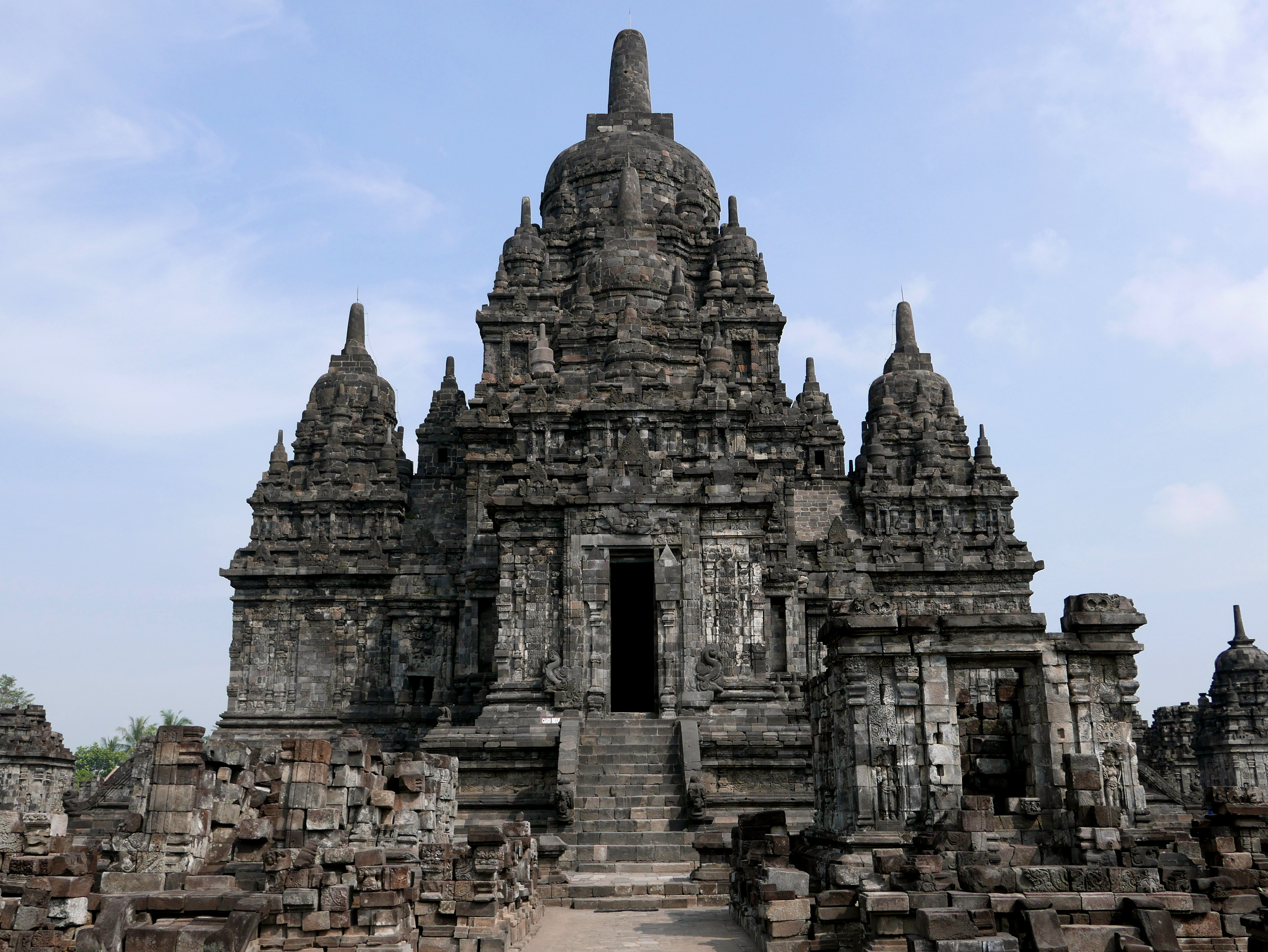
Sewu temple compound

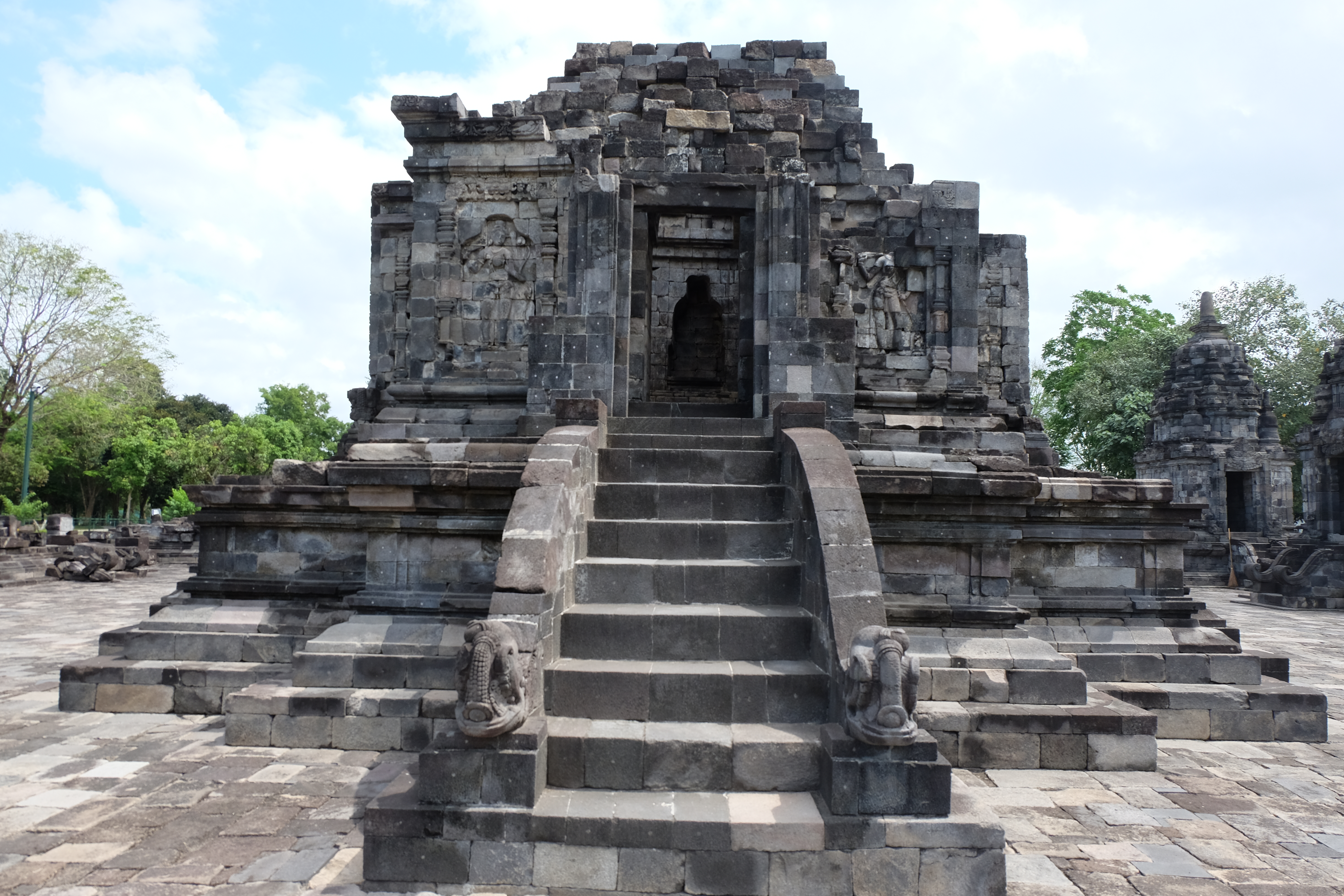
Lumbung temple

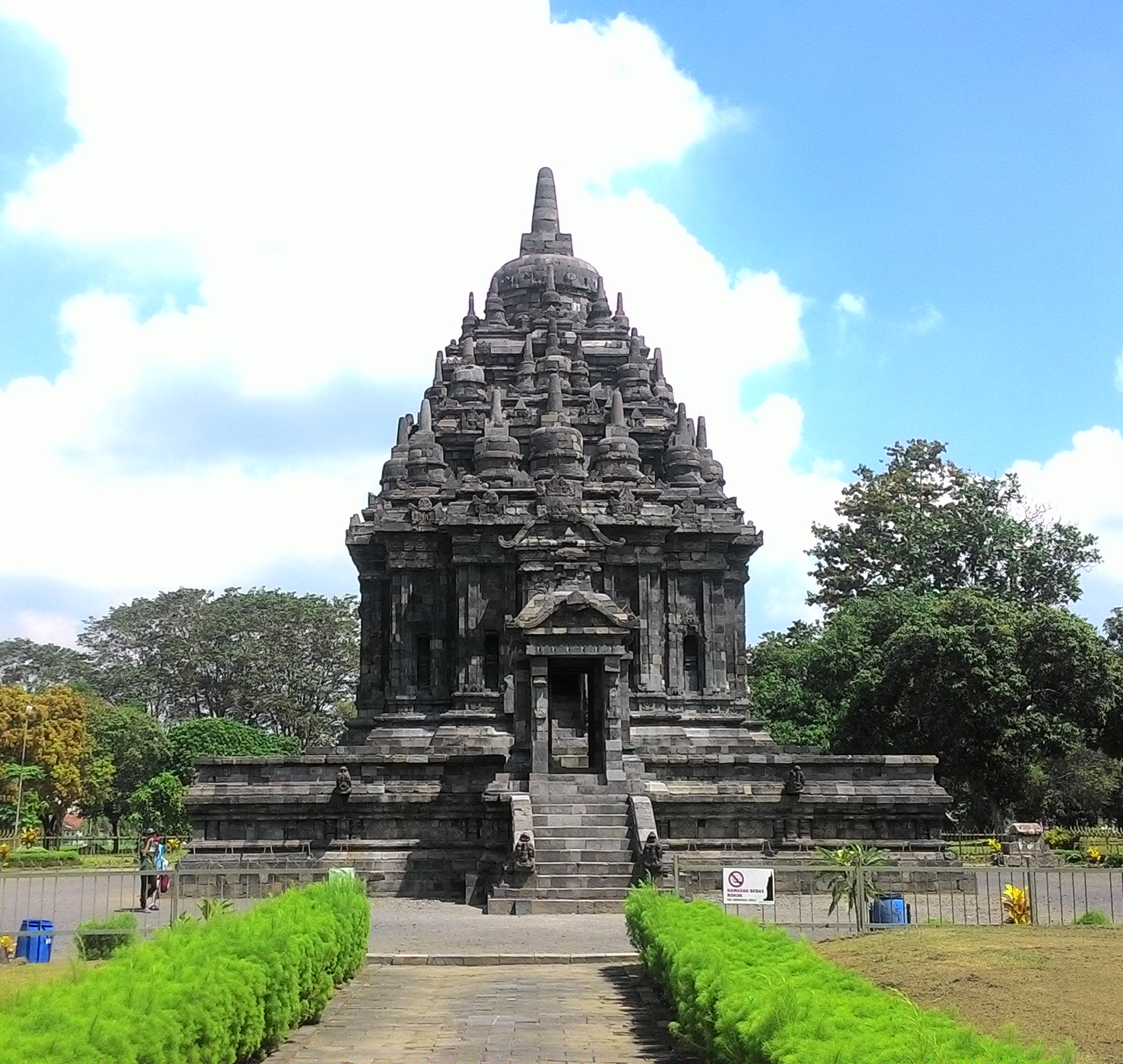
Bubrah temple

== Surrounding temples ==
Outside of Prambanan Temple Tourism Park there are numerous temples and archaeological sites located just a few kilometres away, they are:

- Plaosan. Buddhist temple located a few kilometres east from Sewu temple compound. The temple probably dated from 9th century. Thought to have been built by a Hindu king for his Buddhist queen. Two main temples with reliefs of Boddhisatva and Tara. Also rows of slender stupas.
- Ratu Boko. Complex of fortified gates, bathing pools, and elevated walled stone enclosure, all located on top of the hill.
- Sajiwan. Buddhist temple decorated with reliefs concerning education. The base and staircase are decorated with animal fables from the Jatakas.
- Banyunibo. A Buddhist temple with unique design of roof.
- Barong. A Hindu temple complex with large stepped stone courtyard. Located on the slope of the hill.
- Ijo. A cluster of Hindu temple located near the top of Ijo hill. The main temple houses a large lingam and yoni.
- Arca Bugisan. Seven Buddha and bodhisattva statues, some collapsed, representing different poses and expressions.
- Kalasan. This 8th-century Buddhist temple is the oldest in the area. Built to house the image of Boddhisattvadevi Tara by King Panangkaran, ornamented with finely carved reliefs.
- Sari. Once a sanctuary for Buddhist monks. 8th century. Nine stupas at the top with two rooms beneath, each believed to be places for monks to meditate.
- Sambisari. 9th-century Hindu temple discovered in 1966, once buried 6.5 metres under volcanic ash. The main temple houses a linga and yoni, and the wall surround it displayed the images of Agastya, Durga, and Ganesha.
- Kedulan. Discovered in 1994 by sand diggers, 4 metres deep. Square base of main temple visible. Secondary temples not yet fully excavated.

== See also ==
- Angkor
- Borobudur Temple Compounds, 9th century CE Buddhist temple in Central Java built by Hindu-Buddhist Shailendra dynasty of Mataram kingdom
- Buddhism in Indonesia
- Candi of Indonesia
- Greater India
- Gunung Padang Megalithic Site, in West Java, part of which were developed during Sunda Kingdom
- Hinduism in Indonesia
- Hinduism in Java
- History of Indian influence on Southeast Asia
- Indonesian Esoteric Buddhism
- Sunda Kingdom, Sundanese Hindu kingdom from 669 to around 1579 covering western and central Java including Gunung adang site
