= Bubrah =

9th century Buddhist site in Indonesia

Bubrah temple
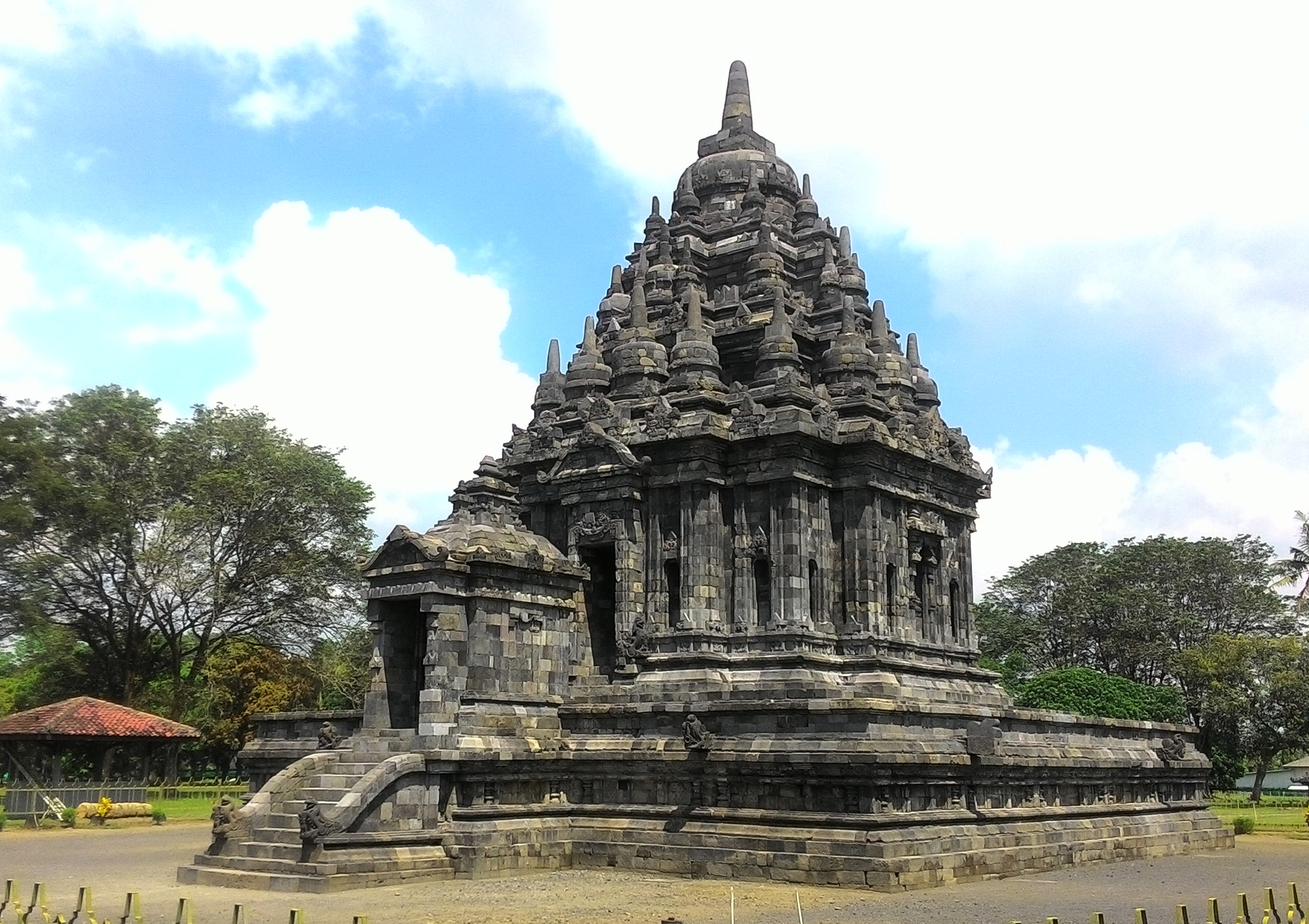
- Candi Bubrah in 2019

- Location within Java Location within Indonesia

General information
- Architectural style: Buddhist candi
- Location: Klaten Regency, Central Java, Indonesia
- Coordinates: 7.7466°S 110.4929°E
- Completed: circa 9th century
- Client: Sailendra or Mataram kingdom

Bubrah (Javanese: ꦕꦤ꧀ꦝꦶꦧꦸꦧꦿꦃ, romanized: Candhi Bubrah) is a 9th-century Buddhist temple located within the complex of the Prambanan Temple Archaeological Park, in Central Java, Indonesia. Experts believe that the temple was designed as a part of the greater Sewu temple compound (Manjusrigrha complex).

The original name of this temple is unknown, however the local Javanese named the temple "candi bubrah", which means "ruins temple" in the Javanese language. The name reflect the conditions of this temple during its discovery, which was a heap of 2 metres tall stone ruins. Bubrah means broken, in ruins or disorderly in Javanese, it has been in a state of ruins for many years, until it was reconstructed between 2011 and 2017. The temple is a part of Prambanan Temple Compounds, a World Heritage Site since 1991.

== Location ==
It is located several hundred meters north from Prambanan temple, located between Sewu temple compound in the north and Lumbung temple in the south. Administratively, this temple is located in Bener Hamlet, Bugisan Village, Prambanan District, Klaten Regency, Central Java. The temple is located within Prambanan or Kewu Plain, an archaeologically rich area dotted with numerous Hindu-Buddhist temples dated circa 8th to 9th century CE. To visit Bubrah temple, visitors can go through the Prambanan temple compound entrance.

== History ==
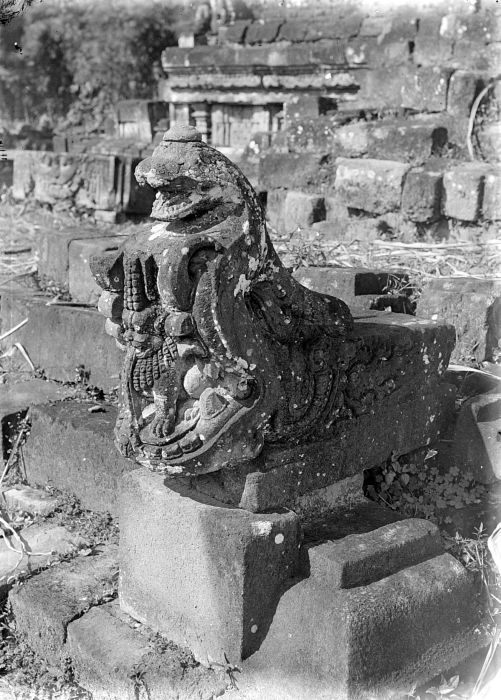
The makara stairs adornment of Bubrah temple in 1900s

Bubrah temple is a Buddhist temple, and was built around the 9th century during the era of the Mataram kingdom that ruled Central Java and some parts of Eastern Java. The temple is closely related to Sewu temple which is located around 300 metres to the north. Bubrah temple believed was constructed around the same period or slightly later after the completion of nearby Sewu and Lumbung temple, all three being a Buddhist-style mandala. The Sewu complex was built by Rakai Panangkaran hailed as Shailendra Wamsatilaka, or the ornament of the Shailendra dynasty. Bubrah temple seems to be added later to complete Manjusrigrha (Sewu) vajradhatu mandala as the southern shrine dedicated as the guardian of directions. Thus possibly Bubrah temple was constructed after the reign of Panangkaran, either during the reign of Dharanindra, or possibly Samaragrawira, which means the temple was constructed in the early 9th century.

After the move of the capital to eastern Java circa the 11th century, the temple was neglected. For centuries later, it fell into disrepair, buried under Mount Merapi volcanic debris and shaken by earthquakes.

The temple was in ruins during its rediscovery back in the early 19th century, along with nearby Prambanan and Sewu temple compound. During its rediscovery, the temple took form of a 2 metres tall mounds of stone, thus the gave the name Bubrah which in Javanese means "ruins". Throughout the 20th century, nothing much had been done to restore and reconstruct the temple, as the temple stones were left scattered around the area.

In 1992, the temple was included within the area of Prambanan Archaeological Park or Prambanan Temple Tourism Park, along with nearby Lumbung, Sewu, and Prambanan temples, registered as Prambanan Temple Compound and recognized as a UNESCO World Heritage Site.

Between 2011 and 2017 the temple had undergone reconstruction. The project developed in 7 stages, and was completed on 14 December 2017, inaugurated by Muhajir Effendy, Indonesian Minister of Education and Culture. The reconstruction took 7 years and 11 billion rupiah cost.

== Design and layout ==
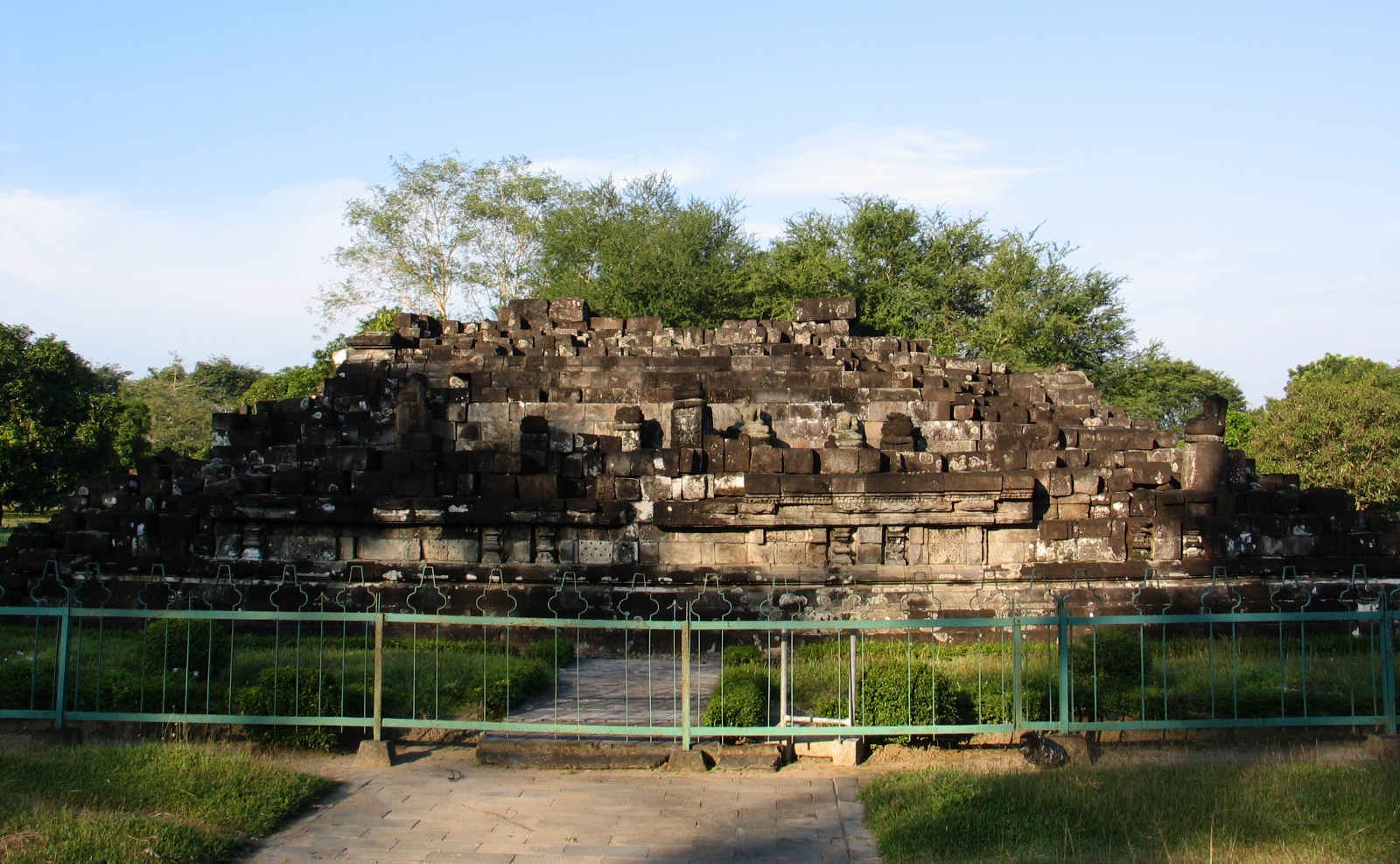
The ruin of Bubrah temple in 2006, prior of reconstruction

The temple plan measures 12 x 12 metres and facing east side, with flight of stairs, portico and portal facing east. The design of the temple is similar to the Apit temple within the Sewu temple compound and Sojiwan temple not far south. The roof is lined with rows of smaller stupas, with larger main stupa as the pinnacle of the structure.

The temple is located around 300 meters south from Sewu temple. Archaeologists suggest that the temple is actually a part of the greater Sewu temple compound (Manjusrigrha complex), as the southern temple marking the southern point of the mandala layout. This suggestion is based on the fact that there is a similar-sized temple on the eastern side called Candi Gana that marking the eastern end on Manjusrigrha mandala. On northern and western sides around 300 metres from Sewu main temple, there were also ruins discovered, however, the stones are too scarce to reconstruct. In conclusion, Bubrah temple were originally part of four vanguard temples placed around 300 meters in four cardinal points from the main temple of Sewu. Bubrah is the guardian temple of southern direction, according to mandala and guardians of the directions concept.

== See also ==
- Candi of Indonesia
- Indonesian Esoteric Buddhism
- Candi Sewu
