= Lumbung =

9th-century Buddhist site in Indonesia

Coordinates: 7.748138°S 110.492871°E

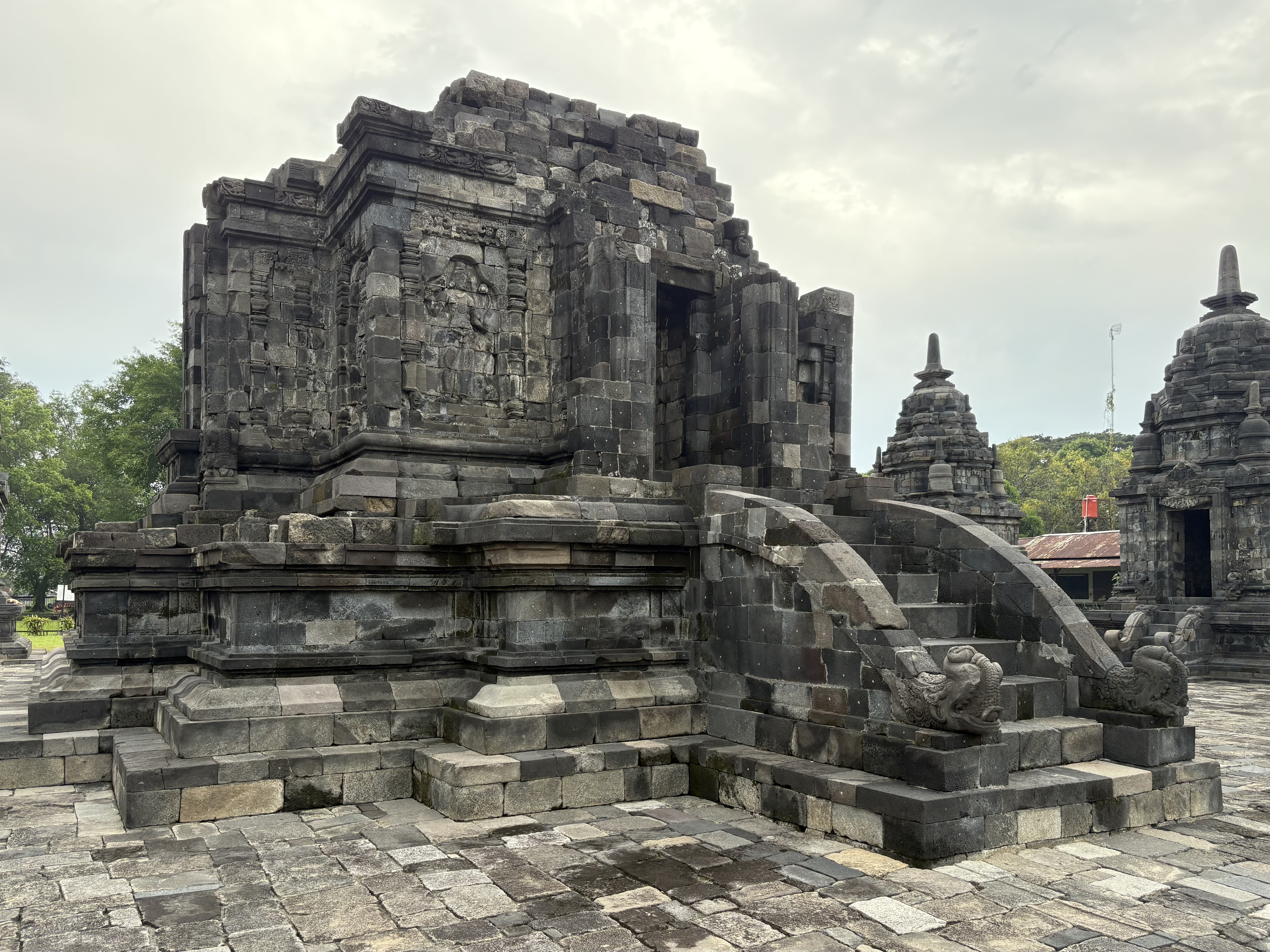
Candi Lumbung, main temple

Lumbung or Candi Lumbung is a 9th-century Buddhist temple compound located within the complex of Prambanan Temple Tourism Park, Central Java, Indonesia. The original name of this temple is unknown, however the local Javanese named the temple "candi lumbung", which means "rice barn temple" in Javanese language.

== Location ==
It is located several hundred meters north from Prambanan temple, next to the Bubrah temple. The temple is located within Prambanan or Kewu Plain, an archaeologically rich area dotted with numerous Hindu-Buddhist temples dated circa 8th to 9th century CE.

== History ==
The temple bears so much similarities with nearby Sewu temple, except it is smaller in scale. The Kelurak inscription dated 704 Saka (782 CE) was discovered near this temple. The inscription mentioned about the construction of a temple compound dedicated to Manjusri Bodhisattva. The mentioned temple was probably refer to Sewu temple instead of Lumbung. According to its architectural style similarities with Sewu, the temple was built in the 9th century at the time of the Ancient Mataram Kingdom. It was around the same period with Sewu and Bubrah temple, yet older than Prambanan.

== Structure ==
This temple compound is composed of a main temple surrounded by 16 perwara (smaller) temples in concentric formal layout. The architectural style is similar to those of the Sewu temple complex nearby. Just like the Sewu and Prambanan temples, this temple faces east with its main entrance located on the east side of the temple compound. However the temple can be reached from all cardinal points. The structure is crowned with stupas. Compared to the ruins of Bubrah temple nearby, the compound of Lumbung temple is still in relatively good condition.

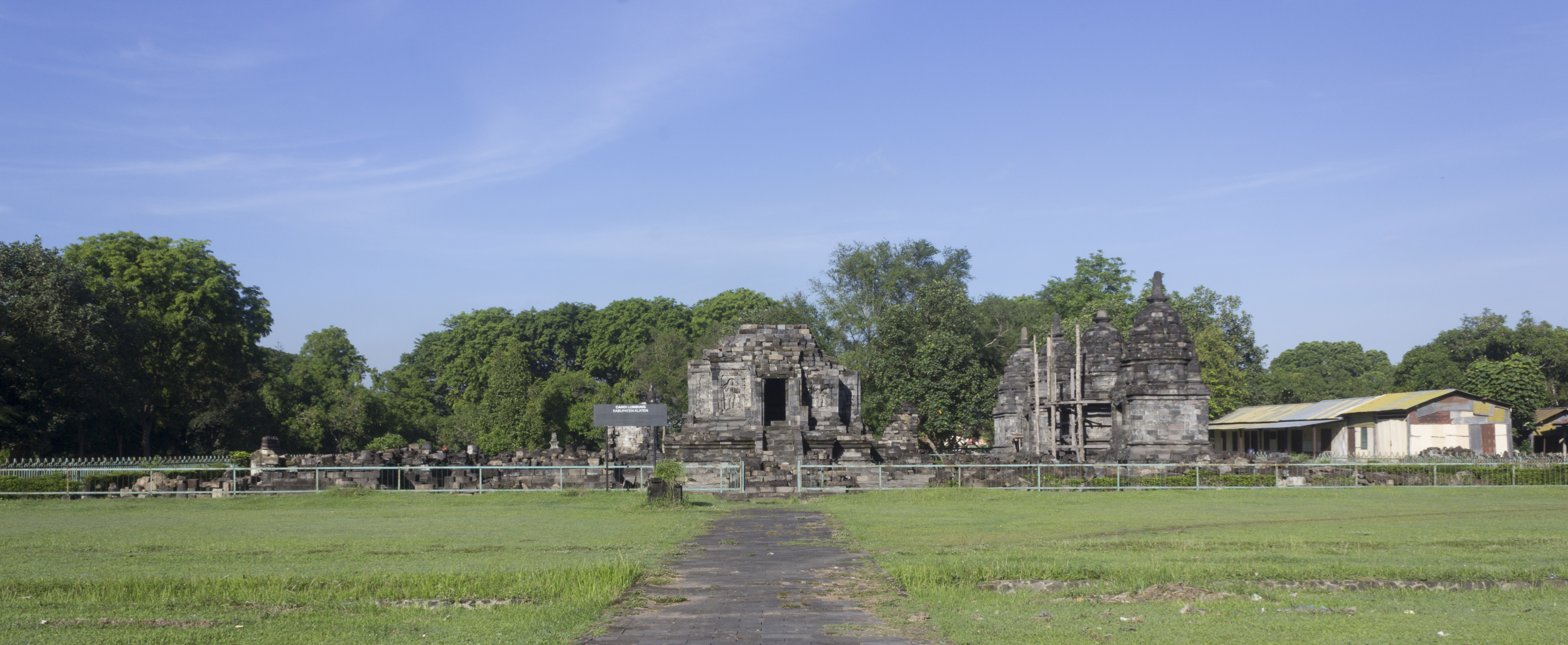
Lumbung Temple compound, viewed from the east
