= Kalasan =

8th-century Buddhist site in Central Java, Indonesia

Kalasan Temple Candi Kalasan ꦕꦟ꧀ꦝꦶꦏꦭꦱꦤ꧀
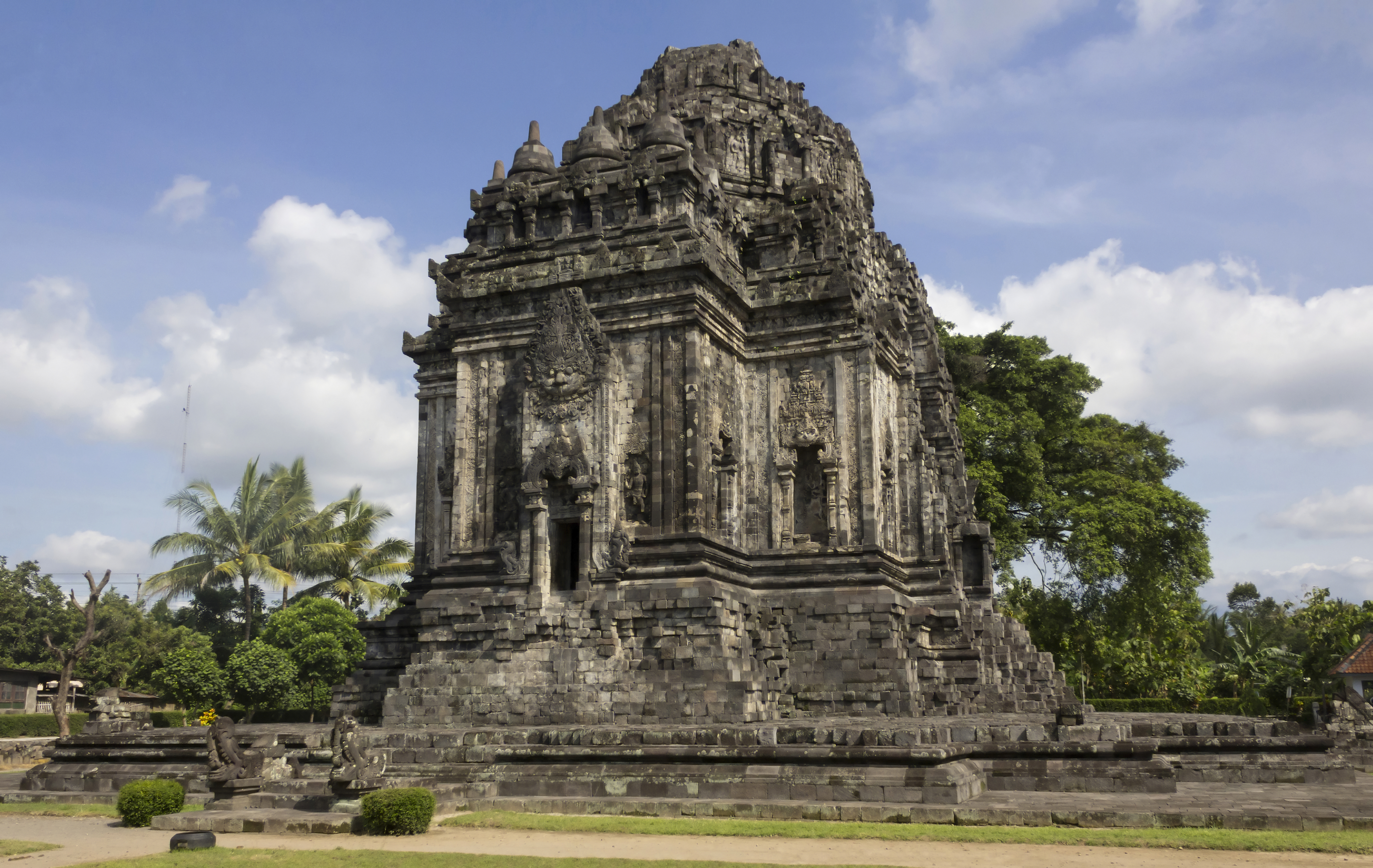
- Kalasan Temple

- Location within Java Location within Indonesia

General information
- Architectural style: Buddhist candi
- Location: Kalasan, Sleman Regency, Special Region of Yogyakarta, Indonesia
- Coordinates: 7.767311°S 110.472335°E
- Completed: circa 8th century
- Client: Sailendra

Kalasan (Indonesian: Candi Kalasan, Javanese: ꦕꦟ꧀ꦝꦶꦏꦭꦱꦤ꧀, Candhi Kalasan), also known as Candi Kalibening, is an 8th-century Buddhist temple in Java, Indonesia. It is located 13 kilometers (8.1 mi) east of Yogyakarta on the way to Prambanan temple, on the south side of Jalan Solo main road (part of Indonesian National Route 15) between Yogyakarta and Surakarta. Administratively, it is located in the Kalasan District (kapanewon) of Sleman Regency.

== History ==
According to the Kalasan inscription dated 778 AD, written in Sanskrit using Pranagari script, the temple was erected by the will of Guru Sang Raja Sailendravamçatilaka (the Jewel of the Sailendra family) who succeeded in persuading Maharaja Tejapurnapana Panangkaran (in another part of the inscription also called Kariyana Panangkaran) to construct Tarabhavanam, a holy building for the goddess (boddhisattvadevi) Tara.

In addition, a Vihara (monastery) was built for Buddhist monks from the Sailendra family's realm. Panangkaran awarded the Kalaça village to Sangha (Buddhist monastic community). According to the date of this inscription, Kalasan temple is the oldest of the temples built in the Prambanan Plain.

Despite being renovated and partially rebuilt during the Dutch colonial era, the temple is currently in poor condition. Compared to other temples nearby such as Prambanan, Sewu, and Sambisari the temple is not well maintained.

== Architecture ==
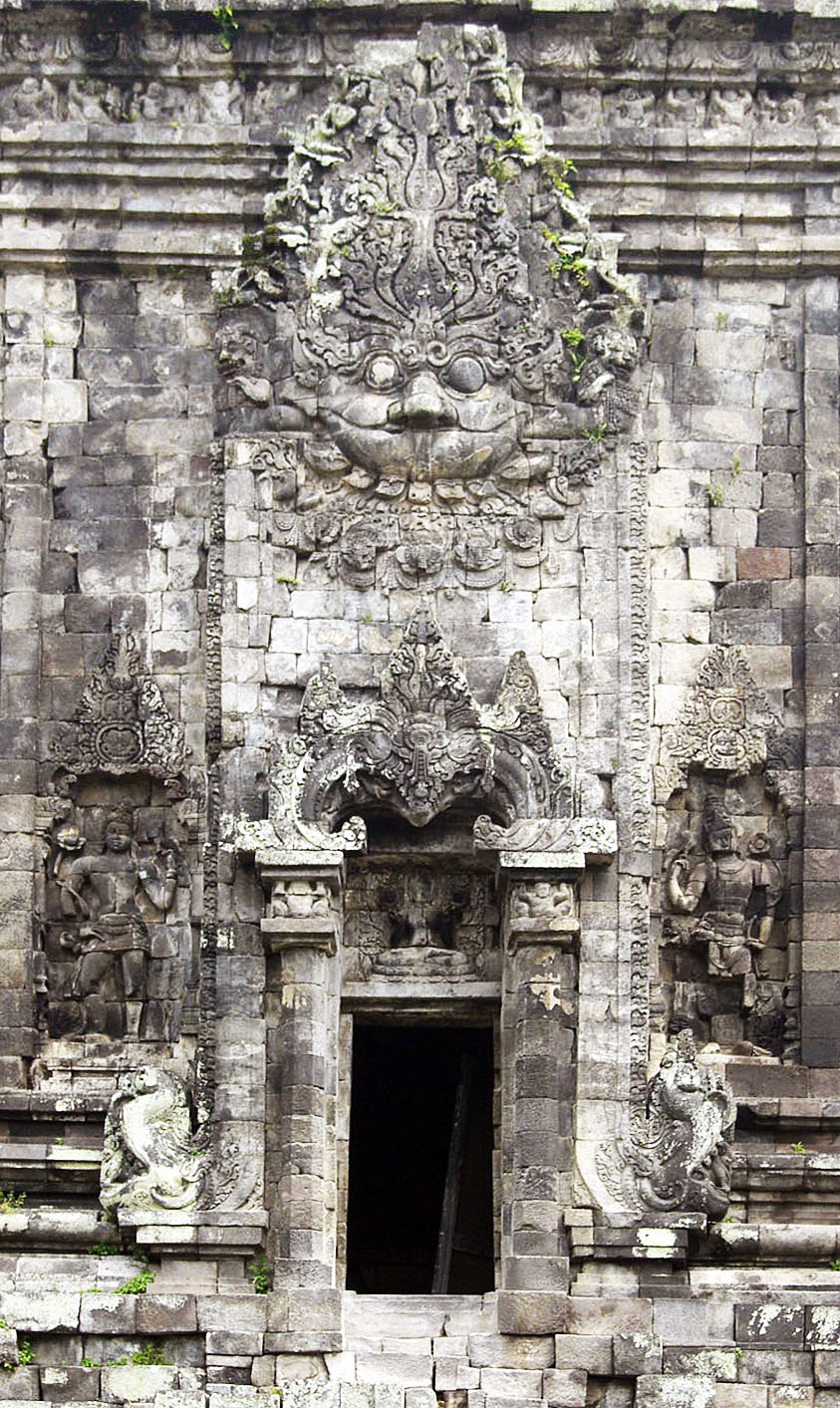
The giant Kala's head on the southern door

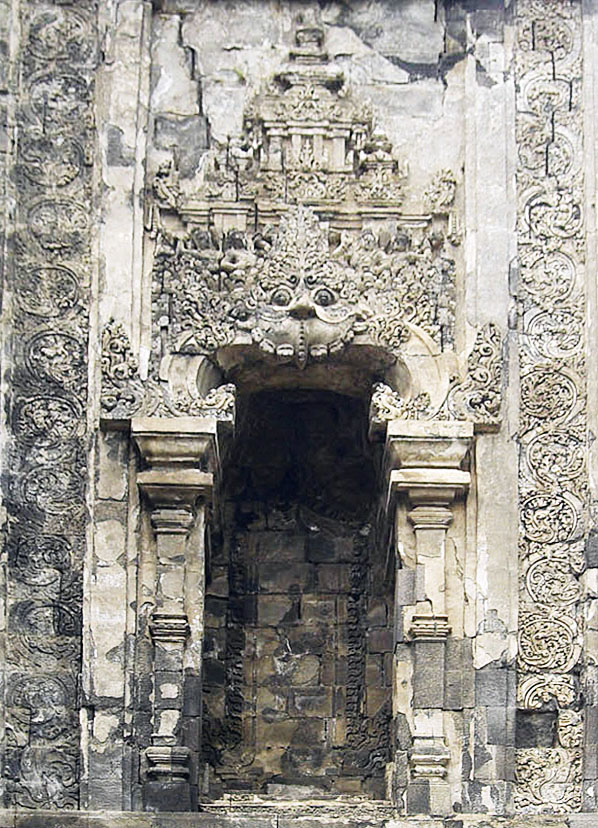
One of the niches on the wall of Kalasan temple adorned with carvings of Kala giant and scene of deities in svargaloka

The temple stands on a square 14.20 meters sub-basement. The temple plan is cross-shaped, and designed as a twelve-cornered polygon. Each of the four cardinal points has stairs and gates adorned with Kala-Makara and rooms measuring 3,5 square meters. No statue is to be found in the smaller rooms facing north, west, and south; but the lotus pedestals suggest that the rooms once contained statues of Bodhisattvas. The temple is richly decorated with Buddhist figures such as the Bodhisattva and Gana. The Kala Face above the southern door has been photographed and used by several foreign academics in their books to give an idea of the artistry in stone by Central Javanese artists of a millennium ago. Niches where the statues would have been placed are found inside and outside the temple. The niches adorned an outer wall intricately carved with Kala, gods, and divinities in scenes depicting the svargaloka, the celestial palace of the gods, apsaras, and gandharvas.

The roof of the temple is designed in three sections. The lower one is still according to the polygonal shape of the body and contains small niches with statues of bodhisattvas seated on a lotus. Each of these niches is crowned with stupas. The middle part of the roof is an octagonal (eight-sided) shape. Each of these eight sides adorned with niches contains a statue of a Dhyani Buddha flanked by two standing bodhisattvas. The top part of the roof is almost circular and also has 8 niches crowned with a single large dagoba. The octagonal aspect of the structure has led to speculation of non-Buddhist elements in the temple, similar to some interpretations of the early Borobudur structure.

The temple is facing east, with the eastern room also serving as access to the main central room. In the larger main room, there is a lotus pedestal and throne carved with makara, lion, and elephant figures, similar to the Buddha Vairocana throne found in Mendut temple. According to the Kalasan inscription, the temple once houses the large (probably reaching 4 meters tall) statue of the Boddhisattvadevi Tara. By the design of the throne, most probably the statue of the goddess was in a seated position and made from bronze. Now the statue is missing, probably the same fate as the bronze Buddha statue in Sewu temple, being looted for scrap metal over centuries.

On the outer wall of the temple found traces of plaster called vajralepa (lit: diamond plaster). The same substance was also found in the nearby Sari temple. The white-yellowish plaster was applied to protect the temple wall, but now the plaster has worn off.

The temple is located on the archaeologically rich Prambanan plain. Just a few hundred meters northeast of Kalasan temple is located Sari temple. Candi Sari was most probably the monastery mentioned in the Kalasan inscription. Further east lies the Prambanan complex, Sewu temple, and Plaosan temple.

== In popular culture ==
- In December 2016, the fourth expansion of the popular real-time strategy PC game from Microsoft, Age of Empires II titled Rise of the Rajas featured Candi Kalasan as the Wonder of the Malay civilization featured in-game.

== See also ==
- Borobudur
- Buddhism in Indonesia
- Candi of Indonesia
- Candi Mendut
- Candi Plaosan
- Candi Sari
- Indonesian Esoteric Buddhism
- Kalasan inscription (778)
