= Sari temple =

8th-century Buddhist site in Indonesia

Coordinates: 7°45′41.49″S 110°28′27″E

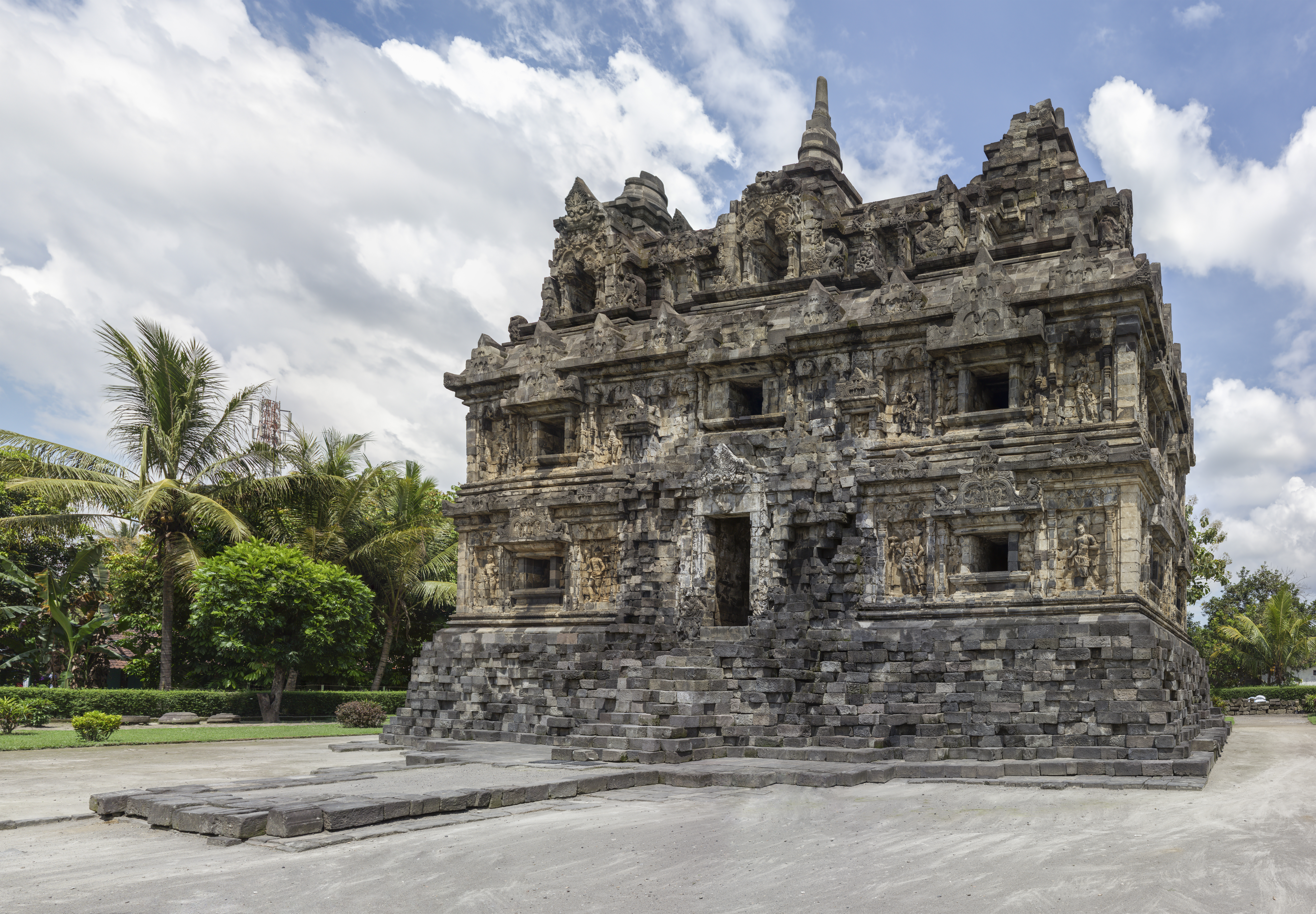
Candi Sari, front view

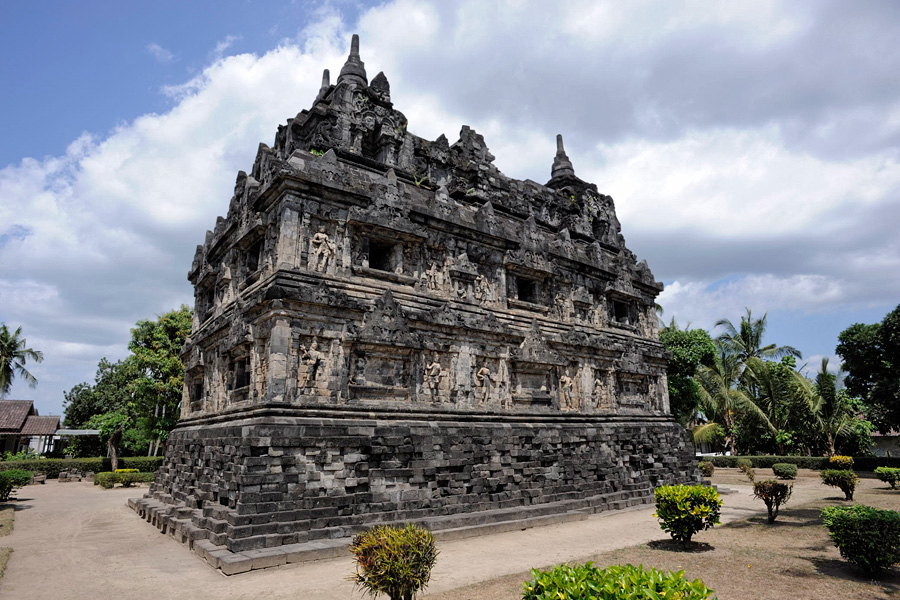
Candi Sari, from the rear

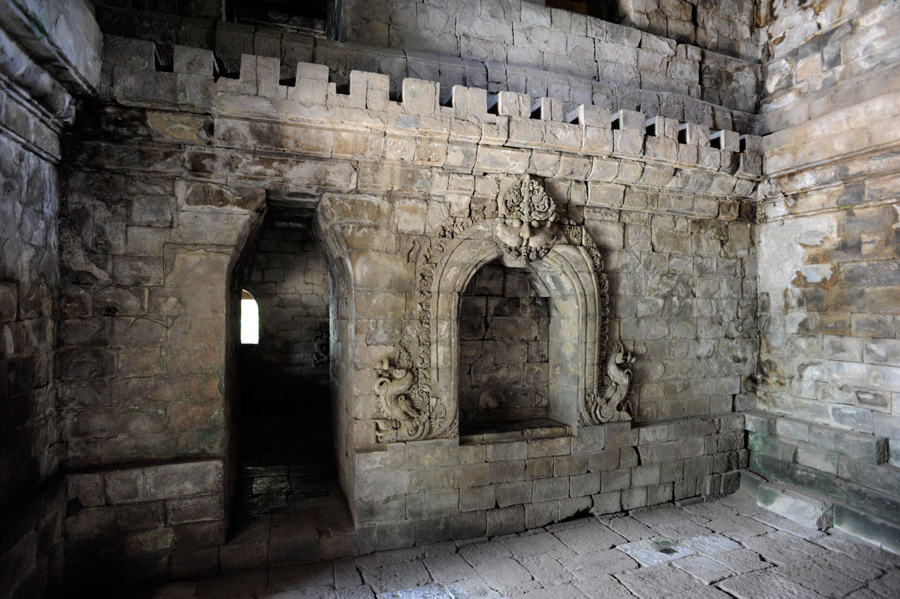
inside Candi Sari

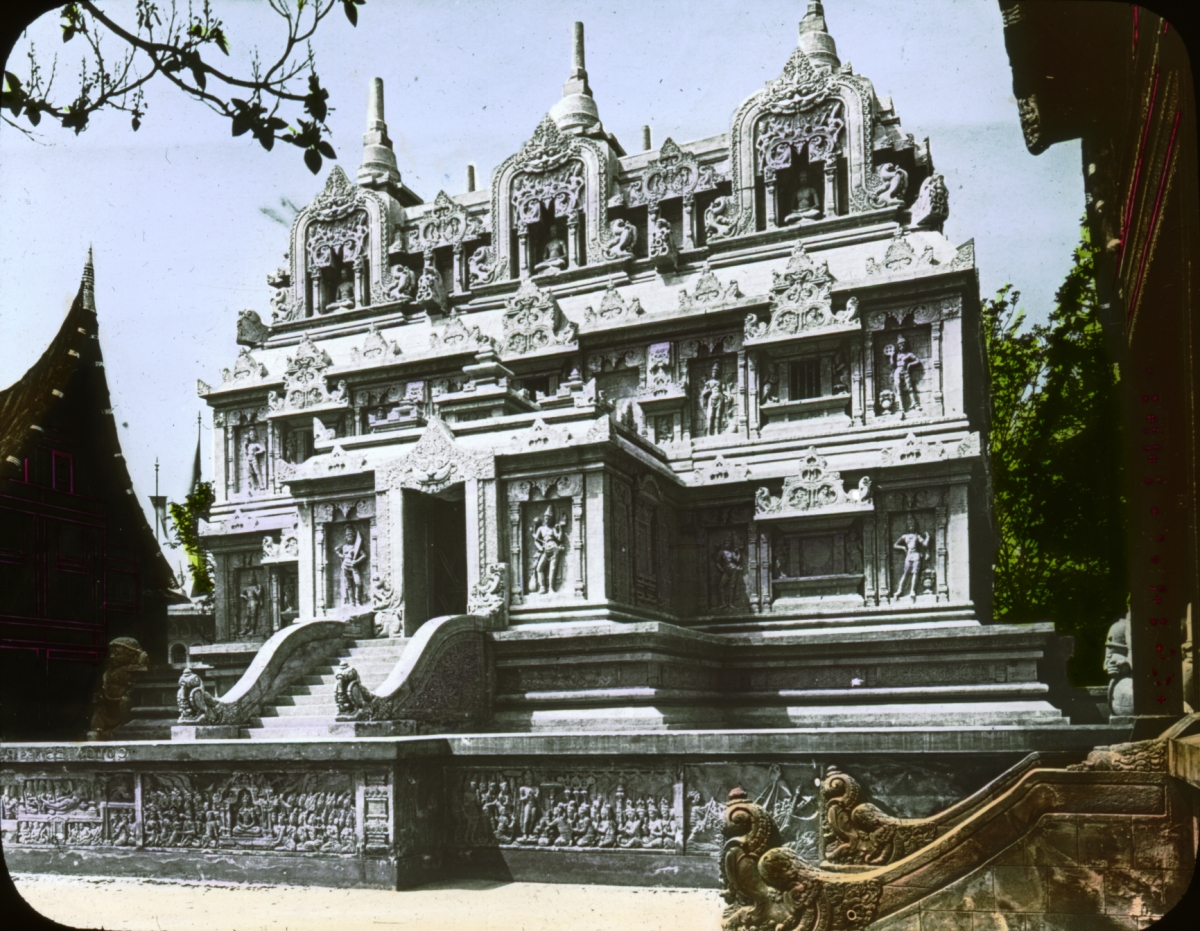
A replica of Candi Sari, one of the three pavilions built for the Dutch East Indies section at Paris Exposition Universelle (1900) in the Jardins du Trocadéro

The Sari Temple (Indonesian: Candi Sari; Javanese: ꦕꦤ꧀ꦝꦶꦱꦫꦶ, romanized: Candhi Sari, also known as Candi Bendan) is an 8th-century Buddhist temple located at Dusun Bendan, Tirtomartani village, Kalasan, Sleman Regency, Special Region of Yogyakarta, Indonesia. It is located about 130 meters (430 ft) northeast of the Kalasan temple. The temple was a two-story building with wooden beams, floors, and stairs completed with windows and doors; all from organic materials which now are decayed and gone. It is suggested that the original function of this building was a vihara (Buddhist monastery), a dwelling place for monks. The temple's name Sari or Saré translates as "to sleep" in Javanese, which also confirms the habitation nature of the building.

== History ==
Historians suggested that the temple was built around the same time as the Kalasan temple. The Kalasan inscription dated 778 AD, in Pranagari script written in Sanskrit, mentions that the temple was erected by the will of Guru Sang Raja Sailendravamçatilaka (the Jewel of the Shailendra dynasty) who succeeded in persuading Maharaja Tejapurnapana Panangkaran (in other parts of the inscription also called as Kariyana Panangkaran) to construct a holy building for the boddhisattva Tara and also build a vihara (monastery) for Buddhist monks from Sailendra family's realm. Panangkaran awarded the Kalara village to the Sangha (the Buddhist monastic community). Based on this inscription, Candi Sari was probably the monastery for monks who served the nearby Kalasan temple.

The ruins were discovered in the early 1920s, and in 1929, an effort to reconstruct the temple began and was finished in 1930. However, it was incomplete because many parts are missing including the outer base that surrounds the temple, and the extended front room and front stairs that once projected from the east wall of the temple.

== Architecture ==
The temple consists of three parts; the base, the body, and the roof. The temple has a rectangular plan, measuring 17.3 m north-south, 10 m west-east, and soaring 17 m in height. Only some parts of the base remain, the outer base stone blocks are missing. The entrance door is located on the eastern side with a gate adorned with a Kala and elephant carving. Windows surround the walls and consist of lower and upper rows. There is also a horizontal middle "belt" line around the wall, suggesting that it was a two-story-tall building.

The interior consists of three rooms; the north room, central room, and south room, each measuring 3 m x 5.8 m. These three rooms are connected with doorways on the eastern side of the room along the north-south axis. On the wall of each room are found rows of extruding stone blocks that used to support wooden beams and a wooden ceiling separating the upper and lower floors. In some places, there are diagonal stones which is probably the place where there used to be a wooden stairway.

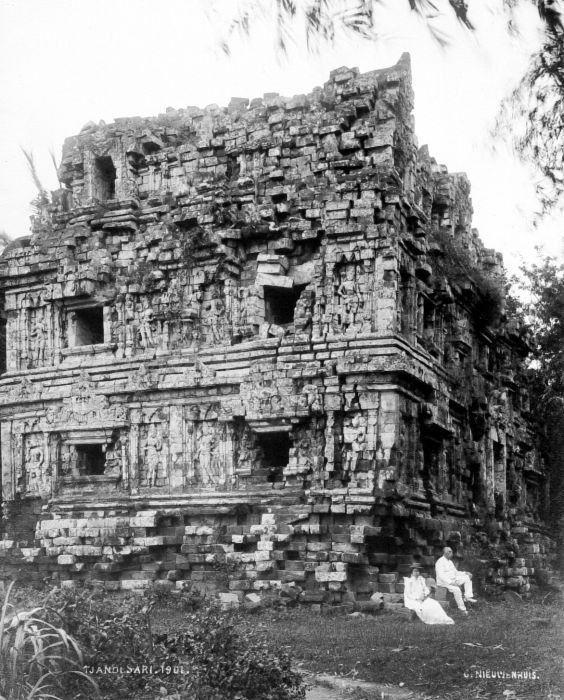
Photo of Candi Sari (1901) by Christiaan Benjamin Nieuwenhuis

The upper level was probably used by monks for meditation or worship. Some suggest the upper rooms were used as the place for monks to stay, rest, or sleep, while the lower rooms were the place for worship. In the lower rooms, there are some elevated parts where statues were once placed, but now the statues are gone. On the side walls are found niches, probably to place oil lamps. In the inner part of each window, there are holes to install wooden window bars.

These rooms were topped with three horse-shoe arched niches adorned with Kala-makaras and crowned with three rows of stupas. Between these arched niches are found rain-water drainage and "jaladwara" water spouts taking the form of a giant sitting on a snake.

The outer wall is richly decorated with Buddhist deities. External decorations include Tara with flowers and Bodhisattvas with musical instruments. These figures are arranged in two upper and two lower rows and placed on each side of the windows. They form a total of 36 statues: 8 on the east, north, and south sides respectively, and 12 on the west side. These Buddhist figures are usually found in the graceful position of Tribhanga, holding red or blue lotuses and displaying peaceful and serene facial expressions. Images of Kinnara-Kinnari also adorn the walls. However, unlike the common depiction of Kinnara as a heavenly creature with an upper human-shaped part and a lower bird-shaped part, the unusual image of Kinnara found on the northern wall shows a winged deity (somewhat similar to how commonly angels are portrayed).

On the outer wall of the temple are found traces of plaster called vajralepa (lit: diamond plaster). The same substance is also found in the nearby Kalasan temple. The white-yellowish plaster was applied to protect the temple wall, but now the plaster has worn off.

== See also ==
- Candi of Indonesia
- Indonesian Esoteric Buddhism
- Banyunibo
- Kalasan
- Kalasan inscription (778 CE)
