= Manjusrigrha inscription =

8th century inscription from Central Java

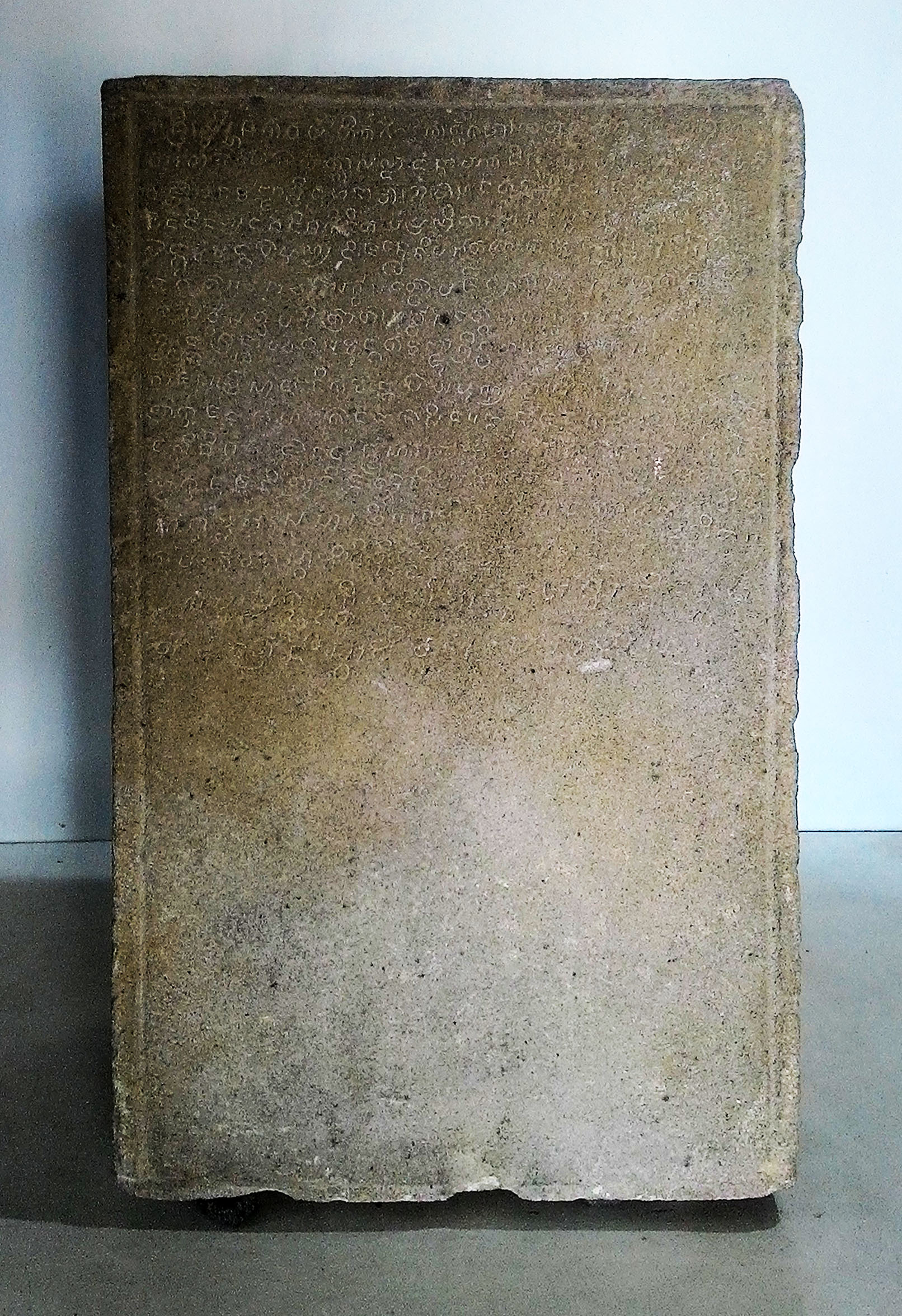
- Manjusrigrha inscription, displayed in Studio Manjusrigrha or Candi Sewu Restoration Museum on the north side of Candi Sewu near Prambanan.
- Material: Andesite stone
- Writing: Old Javanese script in Old Malay and Sanskrit
- Created: 714 Saka (2 November 792 CE)
- Discovered: Discovered in 1960 at the west Perwara Temple No. 202 (Row 4 No. 37) of Sewu Buddhist Temple compound in Klaten Regency, located not far north of Prambanan Temple, Central Java
- Present location: Studio Manjusrigrha (Museum Pemugaran Candi Sewu), Klaten Regency, Central Java

The Manjusrigrha inscription is an inscription dated 714 Saka (792 CE), written in Old Malay with Old Javanese script. The inscription was discovered in 1960 on the right side of the stairs entrance of Sewu pervara (guardian or complementary smaller temple) no. 202 on the west side. The inscription was carved on an andesite stone block measuring 71 cm x 42 cm x 29 cm. The House of Manjusri mentioned in this inscription may be identified with one of the temples belonging to the Sewu complex, located approximately 800 metres north of Prambanan temple, though it is unlikely to be the main Sewu temple, which probably housed statues of the Five Tathāgatas instead.

The inscription mentions the building of a temple tower (prasāda), called Vajrāsana, to house a statue of the boddhisattva Manjusri. This demonstrates Tantrayana—Vajrayana Buddhist influence. The text is remarkable as being by far the oldest known example of a verse text in the Malay language.

== Contents ==
The inscription is written in 16 lines. The following Old Malay text and English translation was published by Arlo Griffiths (2020). The Arabic numerals refer to lines of the inscription, while the Roman numerals refer to verse stanzas.

=== Text ===
(1) śrī svasti śakavarṣātīta 714 kārttikamāsa caturddaśi śuklapakṣa śukra(2)vāra vās· pon· tatkālaṇḍa daṃ nāyaka di raṇḍa lūravaṃ nāmaṇḍa maṃdr̥ṣṭi diṃ (3) vajrāsana mañjuśrī nāmāñaṃ prāsāda tlas· sida maṃdr̥ṣṭi mañamvaḥ (4) sida di daṁ hyaṃ daśadiśa li(kh)ita yaṃ praṇidhānaṇḍa (naras samanta punta rān·) ||

I. pha(5)lāṅku maṃmaṅgap· puṇya diṃ janmeni paratra lai kalpavr̥kṣa mu°aḥ āku diṃ (6) jagat· sacarācara (||)

II. sarvvasatvopajīvyāku sarvvasatvekanāya(7)ka sarvvasatvaparitrātā sarvvasatvekavāndhava ||

III. praṇidh(ī)ni mahā(8)tyanta śraddhāvegasamudgata mañjuśrī samumbhr̥ta sarvvaśrīsukha(9)(bh)ājana

IV. prāsādeni kumaṅgap· ya puṇyāṇḍa śrī nareśvara °ihajanma para(10)trāku jaṅan sārak· daṅan sida ||

V. °ini janma kūminta ya nissāra ka(11)dalī (d)iga °ājñā narendra sārāña (pr̥ṣṭaṃ) - - jagattraya ||

VI. °ājñā(12)ṇḍa kujuṃjuṃ nitya diṃ janmeni paratra lai (v)araṃ kāryya mahābhāra (13) °āku mū°aḥ susārathi ||

VII. svāmikāryya (kada)kṣā(ku) svāmicittia (14) kuparñaman· svāmibhakti dr̥ḍhābhedya phalabukti °anindita ||

VIII. (15) phala puṇya kubhukt(ī)ya dari °ājñ(ā) nareśvara diṃ janmaga(16)ticakreni svāmi mū°aḥ parāyaṇa (•)

=== Translation ===
(1-4) Fortune! Hail! Elapsed Śaka year 714, month of Kārttika, fourteenth of the waxing fortnight, Friday, Vās (of the six-day week), Pon (of the five-day week). That was the time that the reverend chief (daṅ nāyaka) at Raṇḍa, called Lūravaṅ, had a vision at the Vajrāsana. The temple of which he has a vision was called House of Mañjuśrī. He made obeisance to the venerated ones (daṅ hyaṅ) of the ten directions. His resolution (praṇidhāna) was written by Naras Samanta lord Rān.

I. My fruit maṅgaps as merit in this life as well as (lai) in the next: may I be (muah āku) a wish-tree in the world with its moving and stationary beings.

II. (May) I (be) one on whom all beings can depend (upajīvya), the sole leader of all beings, the protector of all beings, the sole relative of all beings.

III. This (ini) resolution (praṇidhi), great and limitless, has arisen due to the impulse of faith. Assembled (sambhr̥ta, as an equipment of merit), the House of Mañjuśrī, will yield universal fortune and happiness.

IV. This temple is maṅgaped by me as the merit of the illustrious (śrī) lord of men (nareśvara). In life here, as well as yonder, may I not be separated (sārak) from him.

V. This life has been requested by me. Like a plantain, it is devoid of a substantial core. It is requested ... the three worlds.

VI. His instruction is always held high by me, in this life as well as yonder. Whenever (his) task is a great burden, may I be (his) trusty charioteer.

VII. The master's task is my expertise. The master's thought is put at ease by me. Devotion (from me) to the master is steadfast (and) unbreakable. The enjoyment of fruits is irreproachable.

VIII. The fruit (which is) merit, (following) from (faithfulness to) the instruction of the lord of men, will be enjoyed by me in this wheel of birth and departure. May the master be the refuge.

== See also ==
- Canggal inscription (732)
- Kalasan inscription (778)
- Kelurak inscription (782)
- Karangtengah inscription (824)
- Tri Tepusan inscription (842)
