= Sojiwan =

9th-century Buddhist site in Indonesia

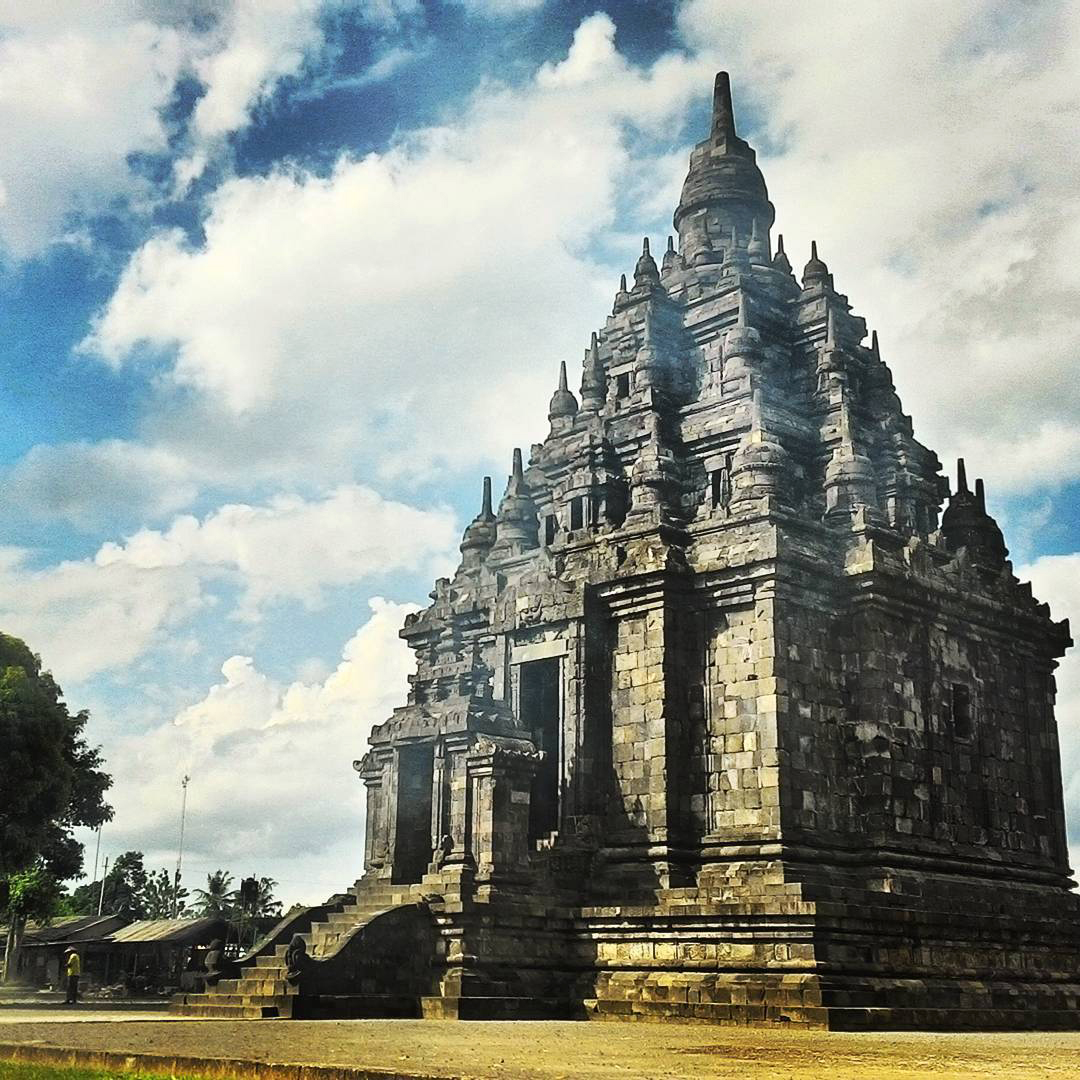
- Sojiwan located within a village southeast of Prambanan

- Location within Indonesia

General information
- Architectural style: Buddhist candi
- Location: near Klaten Regency, Central Java, Indonesia
- Coordinates: 7°45′39″S 110°29′45″E
- Completed: circa 9th century
- Client: Sailendra or Mataram Kingdom

Sojiwan (Javanese orthography: Såjiwan, or sometimes spelled Sajiwan) is a 9th-century Mahayana Buddhist temple located in Kebon Dalem Kidul village, Prambanan, Klaten Regency, Central Java. The temple is located nearly two kilometres southeast of Prambanan temple. This temple is among number of temples scattered in Prambanan Plain.

== History ==
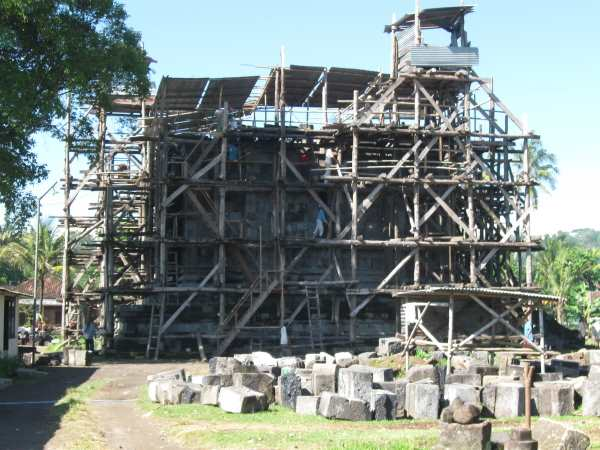
Sojiwan temple, in 2009 during reconstruction

The Rukam inscription dated 829 Saka (907 CE) currently stored in the National Museum of Indonesia mentioned the inauguration of Rukam village restoration by Nini Haji Rakryan Sanjiwana, previously the village was being devastated by a volcanic eruption. In return, the inhabitant of Rukam village was obliged to take care of a sacred building located in Limwung. This sacred building was identified as Sojiwan temple, while the name of the royal patron mentioned in this inscription: Nini Haji Rakryan Sanjiwana, was identified as Queen Pramodhawardhani, the temple bears her name Sajiwan and believed to be dedicated to her. The temple was built between 842 and 850 CE, approximately in the same era as the Plaosan temple nearby.

Sojiwan temple was rediscovered in 1813 by Colonel Colin Mackenzie, a subordinate of Sir Stamford Raffles. He examined the archaeological remains around the Prambanan plain and rediscovered the ruins of the wall surrounding the temple. The temple was left in ruins for decades until the government launched the reconstruction effort started in 1996. Since 1999 the temple become the training and education center for the temple reconstruction project. During the reconstruction, the excavation discovered a wall structure surrounding the temple and also a stone-paved causeway in front of the temple. In 2006 the reconstruction project was halted and took a major blow because of the earthquake, which caused the reconstructed building parts and scaffolding to collapse. The reconstruction project was completed in December 2011, and inaugurated by Mari Pangestu, Indonesian Minister of Tourism and Creative Economy. The reconstruction took 15 years and 8.27 billion rupiah cost.

== Architecture ==
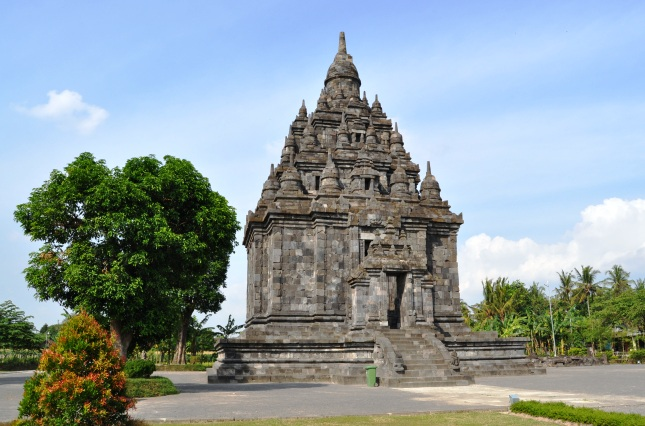
Sojiwan temple in 2014, after reconstruction

The temple was made of andesite stone, its size, style, and form are similar to those of the Mendut temple near Borobudur. The temple complex measures 8,140 square meters, with the main building measuring 401.3 square meters and 27 meters high. The base of the temple contains 20 bas-reliefs connected to the Buddhist stories of Pancatantra or Jatakas from India. From these 20 reliefs, 19 remain. The stairway is flanked by two large makaras. The inner chamber of the temple contains two niches and lotus pedestals, originally hosting Buddha and Bodhisattva statues. However, currently, the chamber is empty. The temple roof took the form of a stepped pyramid crowned with stupas.

During the restoration project, the excavation works discovered two rows of walls surrounding the temple, located 14 meters and 30 meters from the main temple. Other discoveries include paved pathways, stairs, and temple stone block fragments surrounding the main temple, suggesting that Sojiwan was a temple complex, there were perwara temples (lesser complementary temples) that once stood within the temple complex.

== Location ==
from wikimapia

== See also ==
- Candi of Indonesia
- Indonesian Esoteric Buddhism
- Plaosan
