= Plaosan =

9th-century Buddhist site in Indonesia

Coordinates: 7°44′25″S 110°30′16″E

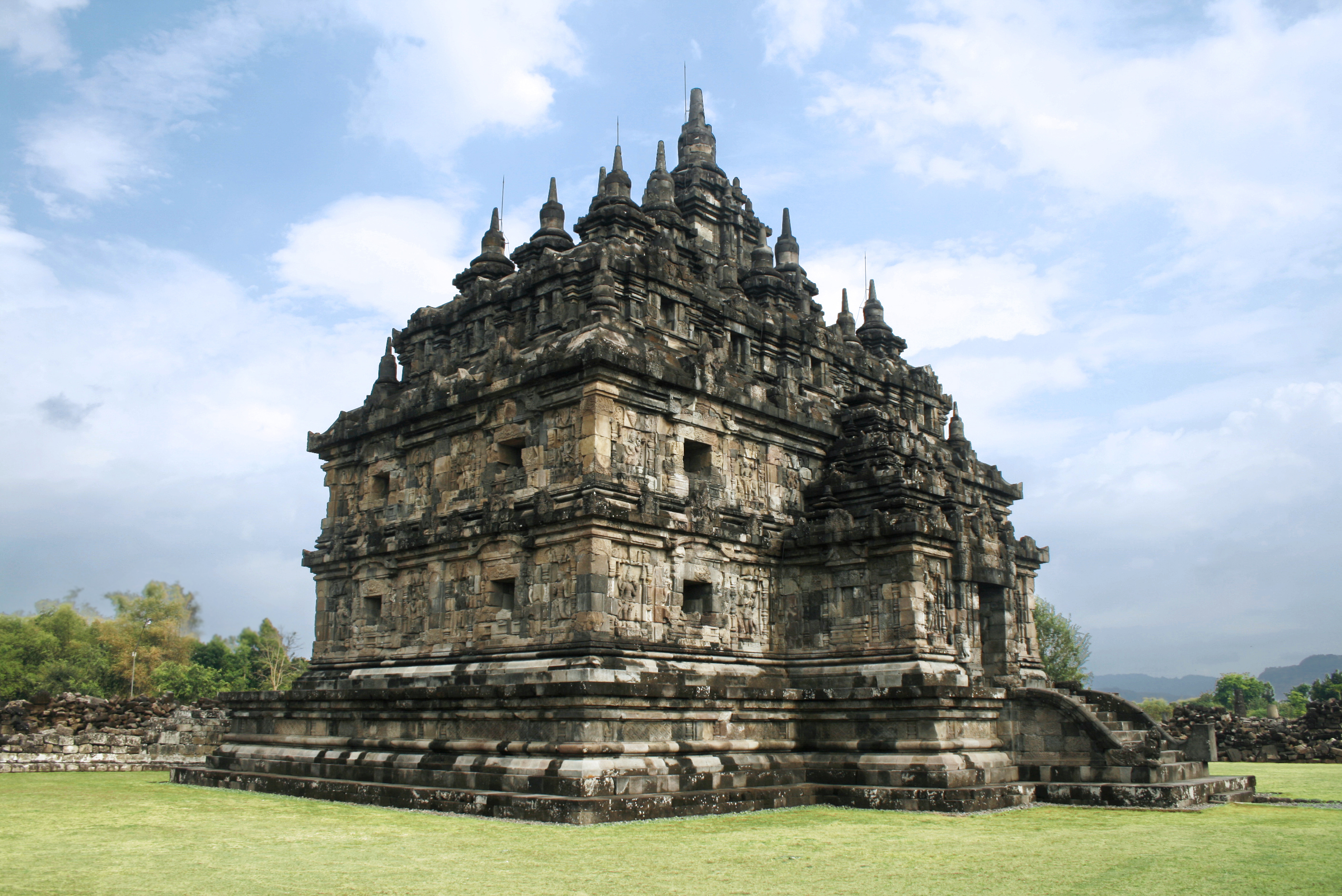
One of the twin main temples of the Plaosan Lor compound.

Candi Plaosan, also known as the Plaosan Complex, is one of the Buddhist temples located in Bugisan village, Prambanan district, Klaten Regency, Central Java, Indonesia, about 1 kilometre (2/3 mile) to the northeast of the renowned Hindu Prambanan Temple.

Candi Plaosan covers an area of 2,000 square metres (22,000 square feet) with an elevation of 148 metres (486 feet) above sea level. The Dengok River is located nearby, about 200 metres (220 yards) away. Candi Plaosan is surrounded by paddy fields along with vegetation such as bananas and corn.

== Historical background ==
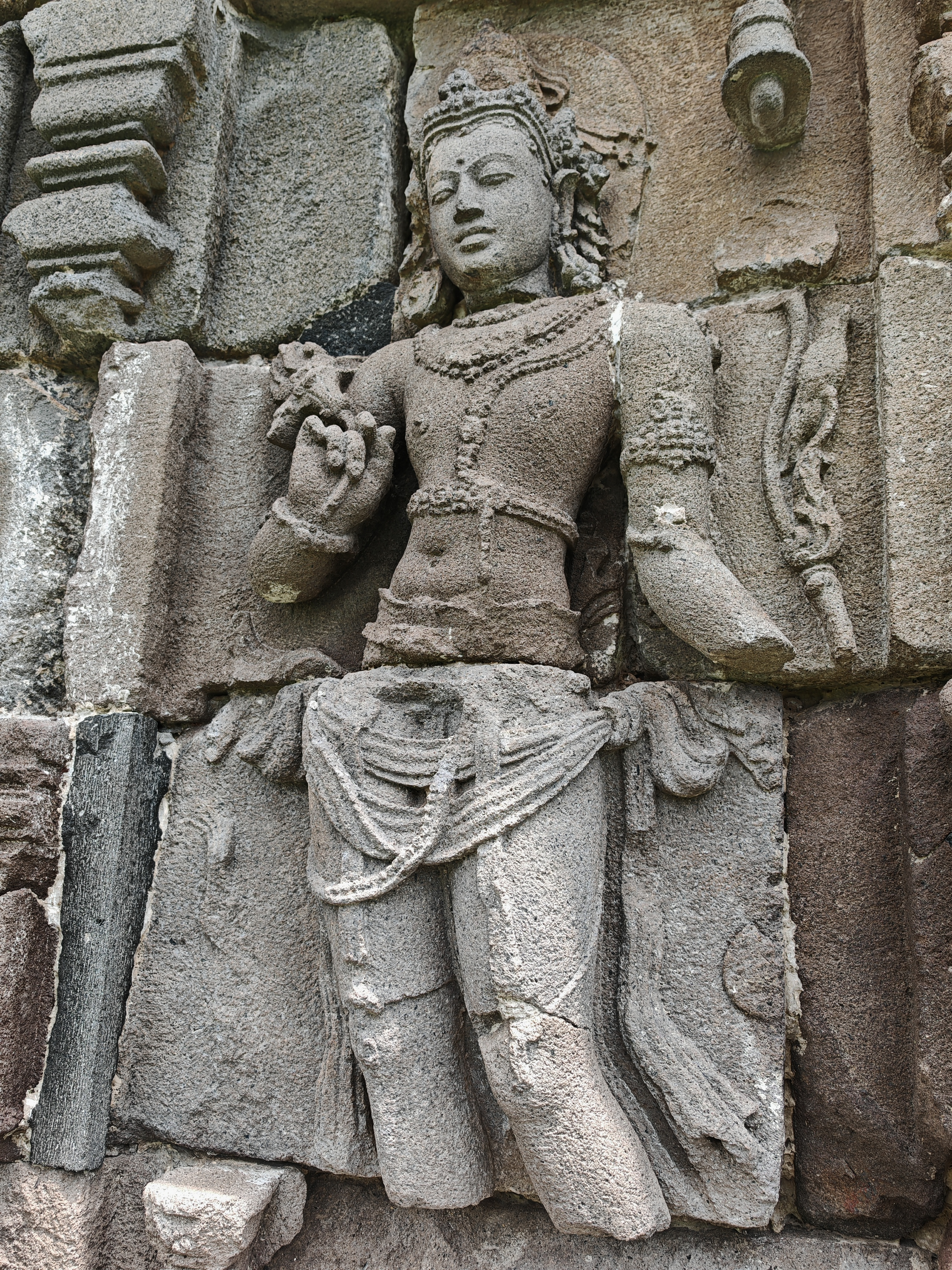
Avalokiteśvara on Plaosan main temple wall.

Plaosan temple was built in the mid-9th century by Sri Kahulunnan or Pramodhawardhani, the daughter of Samaratungga, a descendant of the Sailendra dynasty, and who was married to Rakai Pikatan in the Hindu tradition.

The Plaosan complex currently comprises two Buddhist temples, Plaosan Lor and Plaosan Kidul.

The inscriptions and images of Plaosan Lor and Kalasan have raised questions about the origins of the complex and the relationships between the images found and the religious complexity of the area when the structures were created.

The temples are separated by a road; Plaosan Lor is located in the North and Plaosan Kidul in the South. Plaosan Lor consists of two main temples and an open area known as a mandapa. Both temples have an entrance, a gate, and a guardian statue known as Dwarapala. Plaosan Lor and Plaosan Kidul are considered to originally be one complex.

== Architecture ==
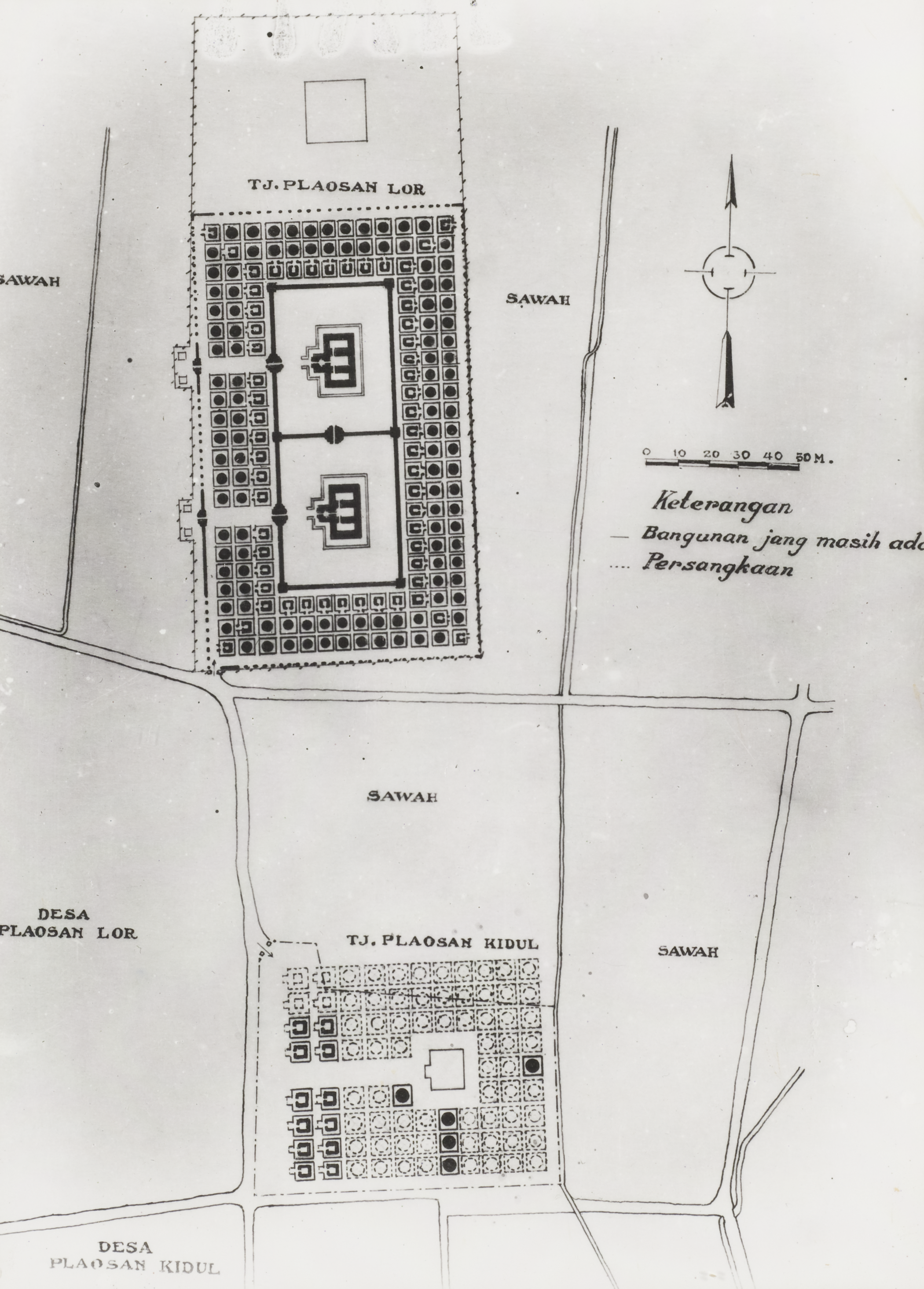
Map of Plaosan temple complex

The Plaosan temple complex is made up of 174 small buildings, of which 116 are stupas and 58 are shrines. Many of the buildings have inscriptions. Two of these inscriptions denote the temple as a gift of sanctuary by Rakai Pikatan. The dates of the inscriptions are between 825 and 850 AD. Although similar to the Prambanan 856 AD date, the complexes are not related. A new building technique distinguishes Prambanan from Plaosan temples.

The main temples at Plaosan are made up of an upper and lower level, separated in three rooms. On the lower level, multiple statues resided. Today, only two statues of Bodhisattva seat on each side of each room, flanked an empty pedestal. However, as the position of the false windows dictated, there was only one statue resting on the bottom basal level on a central pedestal. This statue today is missing, it was probably some bronze statue depicting Buddha with two stone Bodhisattva statues flanking it. Historians suggest that the main temple once contained nine statues, six stone Bodhisattvas, and three bronze Buddhas (now missing). This means there were 18 statues residing in the twin main temples.

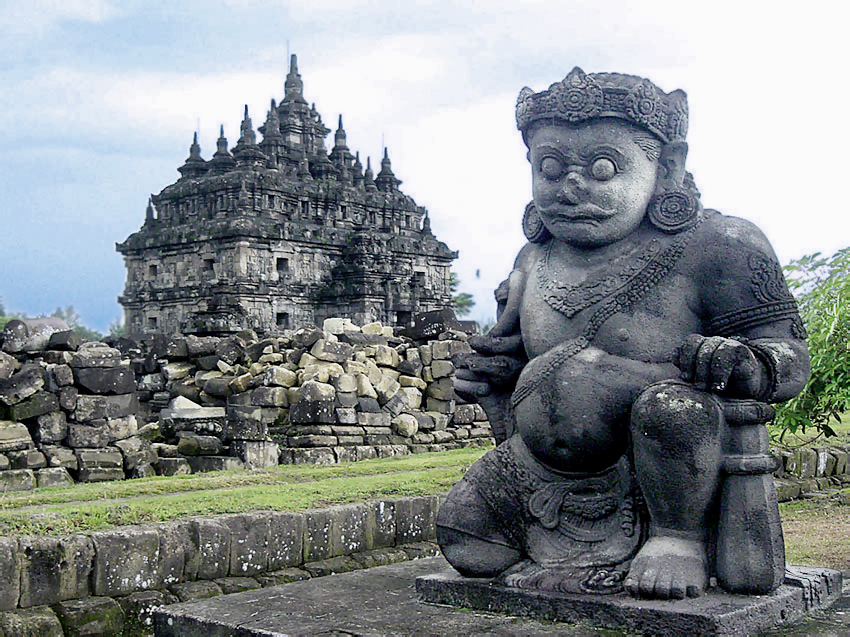
Dvarapala, the giant guardian in front of Plaosan Temple.

On the upper walls of each room, there are traces of stone indentions that once supported wooden beams and wooden floors, creating upper rooms. There are also traces of stones at the base for wooden stairs.

Rows of exquisite carvings of Bodhisattvas divinities are found adorning the outer walls, with the majority of them being male. Smaller and less occurring carvings by the windows represent female figures.

One exceptional example is carved on the inner wall of the room depicting a representation of a Khmer prince which is identified by his crown.

== 2000s era ==
In 2006 an earthquake that affected Prambanan damaged Plaosan. Excavations in the area have uncovered significant artefacts.

== See also ==
- Borobudur
- Mendut
- Pawon
- Candi of Indonesia
- List of Buddhist temples
