= Sewu =

8th-century Buddhist site in Indonesia

Sewu Temple Compound (Manjusrigrha)
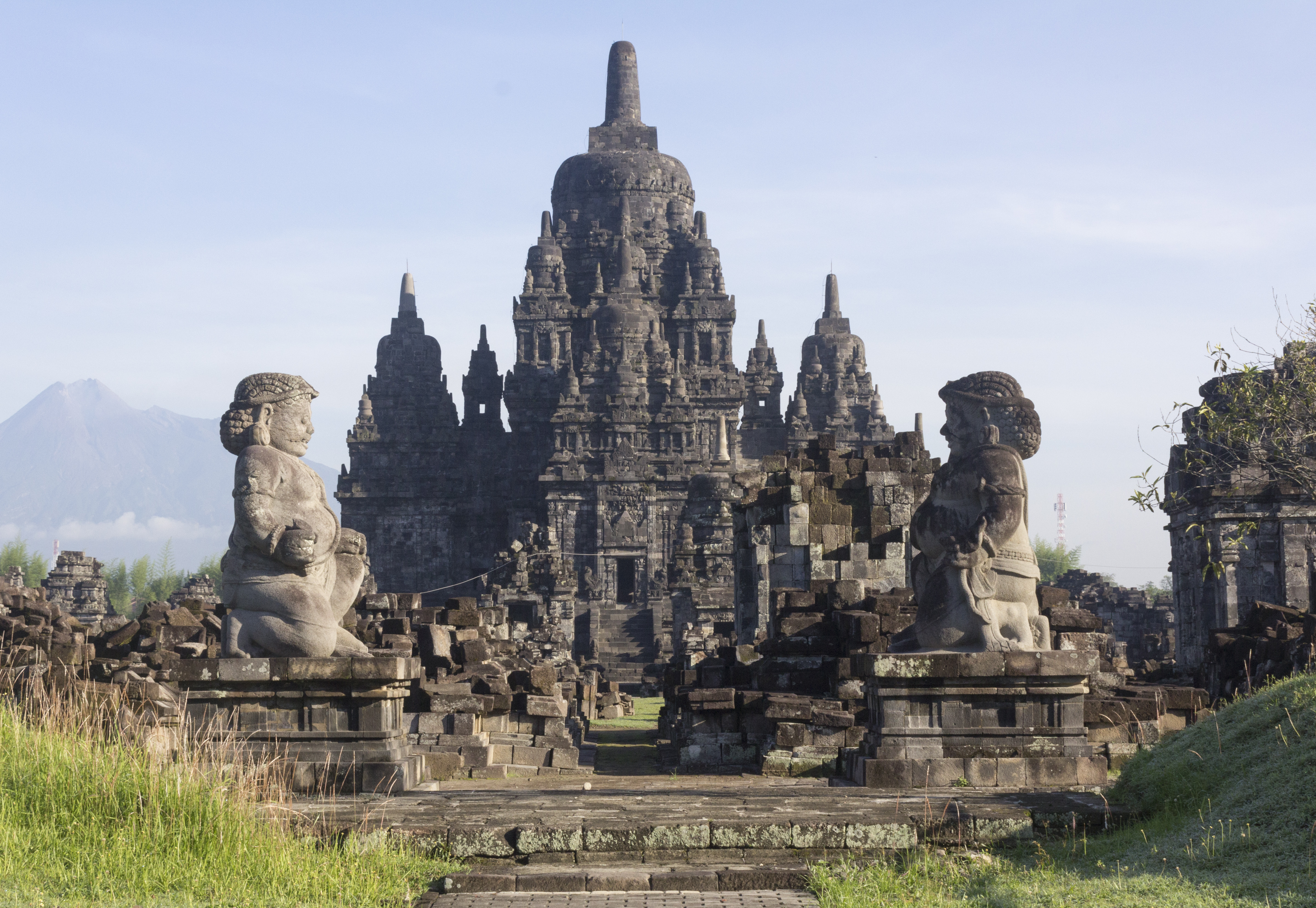
- The Sewu temple compound

- Location within Java Location within Indonesia

General information
- Architectural style: Buddhist candi
- Location: Klaten Regency, Central Java, Indonesia
- Coordinates: 7.7435°S 110.4935°E
- Completed: circa 8th century
- Client: Sailendra or Mataram kingdom

Sewu (from Old Javanese Sewu, Javanese: ꦱꦺꦮꦸ, romanized: Sèwu) is an eighth-century Mahayana Buddhist or Hindu temple located 800 metres north of Prambanan in Central Java, Indonesia. The word for a Hindu or Buddhist temple in Javanese is "candi" (from Kawi caṇḍi), hence, the common name is "Candi Sewu". Candi Sewu is the second largest Buddhist temple complex in Indonesia; Borobudur is the largest. Sewu predates it and it is located near the "Loro Jonggrang" temple at Prambanan. Although the complex consists of 249 temples, this Javanese name translates to 'a thousand temples,' which originated from popular local folklore (The Legend of Roro Jonggrang). Archaeologists believe the original name for the temple compound to be Manjusrigrha.

== History ==
=== Construction ===
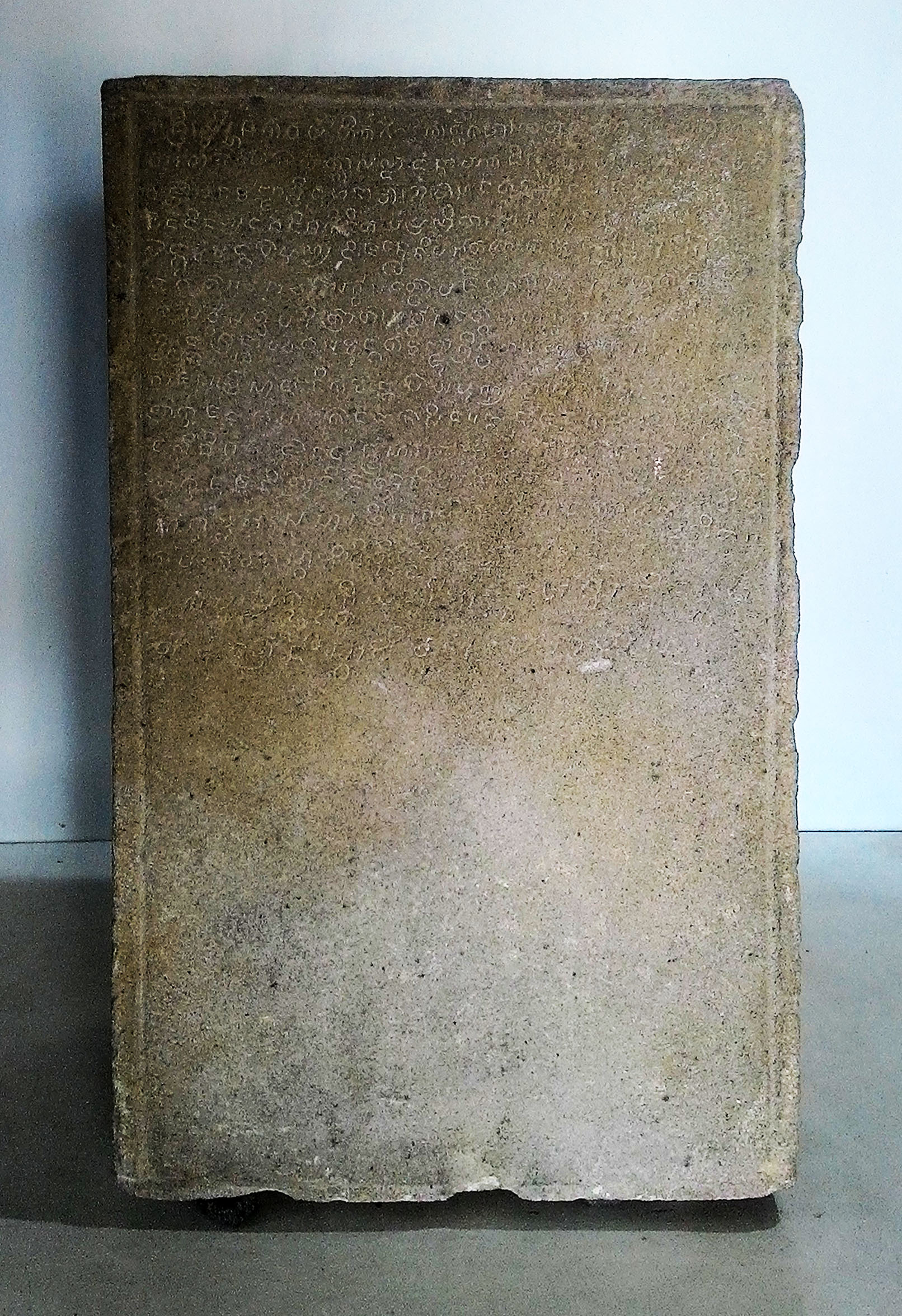
Manjusrigrha inscription (792 CE), discovered in 1960 at the outer west perwara temple no. 202 (row 4 no. 37) of Sewu Buddhist temple.

According to the Kelurak inscription (dated from 782 CE) and the Manjusrigrha inscription (dated from 792 CE), which were discovered in 1960, the original name of the temple complex was probably "Manjusri grha" (The House of Manjusri). Manjusri is a Bodhisattva from Mahayana Buddhist teachings that symbolizes the "gentle glory" of transcendent wisdom (Sanskrit: prajñā). Sewu Temple was built by the end of the eighth century at the end of Rakai Panangkaran's reign and was completed during the reign of his successor, King Indra. Rakai Panangkaran (746–780 CE) was well-known as a devoted Mahayana Buddhist king who ruled the Medang Mataram Kingdom.

The Manjusrigrha temple was the largest Buddhist temple in the Prambanan Plain region, predating the nearby Prambanan Shaivist temple by over 70 years and the Borobudur by about 37 years. Located in the heart of Mataram, the temple served as the royal Buddhist temple of the kingdom. Stately religious ceremonies were held here regularly. The Manjusrigrha inscription (792) praises the perfect beauty of the prasāda (temple shaped like a tower) of this religious complex. The Bubrah temple, located several hundred meters south, and the Gana temple, located east of the Sewu temple, probably served as guardian temples for the Manjusrigrha complex, guarding the four cardinal directions around the Sewu temple. The ruins of the Lor temple to the north of Sewu and the Kulon temple on the western side are both in poor condition; only a few stones remain on those sites. Before the construction of Borobudur and Prambanan, Sewu likely served as the kingdom's main temple. The temples are arranged in the mandala layout, which symbolizes the universe in Buddhist cosmology.

Sewu temple was probably expanded and completed during the rule of Rakai Pikatan, a prince who married a Buddhist princess from the Sailendra dynasty, Pramodhawardhani. Most of his subjects retained their old religions after the court returned to favor Hinduism. The proximity of the Sewu temple to Prambanan, a Hindu Temple, suggests that the Hindu and Buddhist communities lived in harmony during the era in which the temples were built. The scale of the temple complex suggests that Candi Sewu was a royal Buddhist temple that served as an important religious site. The temple is located on the Prambanan Plain, between the southeastern slopes of the Merapi volcano and the Sewu mountain range in the south, near the present border of Yogyakarta province and Klaten Regency in central Java. The plain has many archaeological sites scattered only a few miles apart, which suggests that this area served as an important religious, political, and urban center.

=== Rediscovery ===
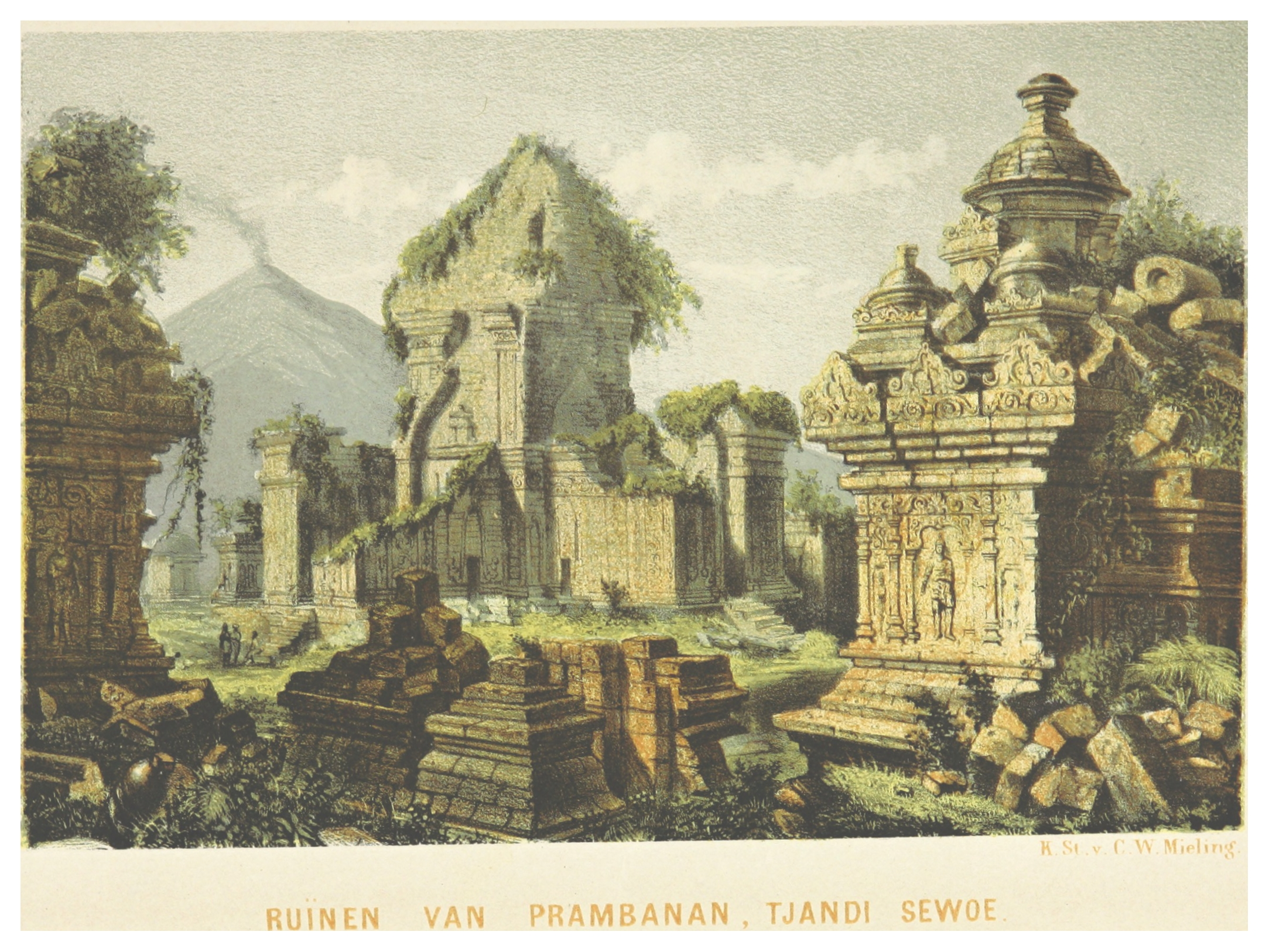
A lithograph of Tjandi Sewoe ruins near Prambanan, circa 1859

Although buried deep beneath the volcanic debris around Mount Merapi, the temple ruins were not completely forgotten by the local Javanese inhabitants. However, the origins of the temple were a mystery. Over the centuries, tales and legends infused with myths of giants and cursed princesses were recounted by villagers. Prambanan and Sewu were purported to be of supernatural origin, and in the legend of Loro Jonggrang, they were said to have been created by a multitude of demons under the order of Bandung Bondowoso. Such tales are most likely the reason the temples were preserved through the centuries before the Java War (1825–1830). The local villagers dared not remove any of the temple stones, believing the ruins to be haunted by supernatural beings.

In 1733, Pakubuwono II granted the Dutch merchant Cornelius Antonie Lons permission to make a sightseeing tour through the heartland of Mataram. Lons' report of this trip contains the first known extant description of the Sewu and Prambanan temples. In the years 1806–07, the Dutch archaeologist Hermann Cornelius unearthed the Sewu temples and created the first lithographs of Candi Sewu's main temple and the Perwara temple. After Britain's short-lived rule of the Dutch East Indies, Thomas Stamford Raffles included Cornelius' image of Candi Sewu in his 1817 book The History of Java. In 1825, the Belgian architect Auguste Payen created a series of Candi Sewu images.

During the Java War (1825–1830), some of the temple stones were carted away and used in fortifications. In the years that followed, the temples suffered from looting. Many of the Buddha statues were decapitated, and the heads stolen. Some Dutch colonists stole sculptures and used them as garden ornaments, and native villagers used the foundation stones as construction material. Some of the temple's best-preserved bas-reliefs, Buddha's head, and some ornaments were carried away from the site and ended up in museums and private collections abroad.

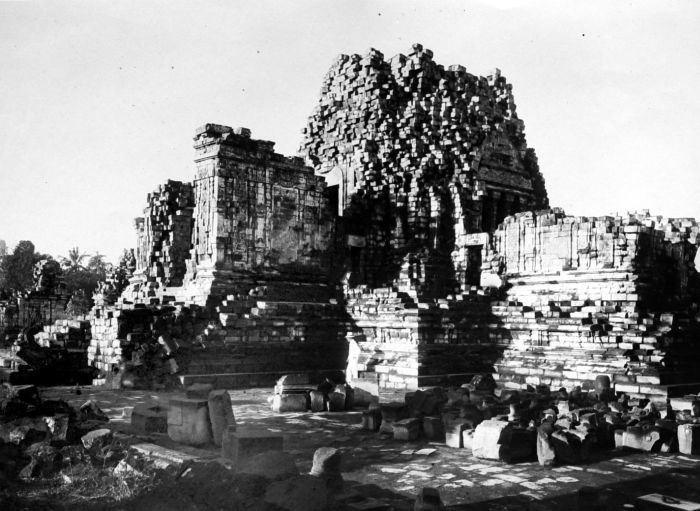
Sewu main temple before reconstruction

In 1867, Isidore van Kinsbergen photographed the ruins of Candi Sewu after an earthquake had caused the dome in the main temple to collapse. In 1885, Jan Willem IJzerman, revising some plans of the temple complex made earlier by Cornelius, made notes regarding the temple's condition. He noted that several Buddha heads were missing. By 1978, none of the Buddha heads had survived, all of them having been looted from the site completely.

In 1901, a new set of photographs was taken, sponsored by Leydie Melville. In 1908 Theodoor van Erp initiated the clearing and reconstruction of the main temple, and in 1915 H. Maclaine Pont drew the reconstruction of a temple of the second row. It was de Haan who reconstructed the Perwara temples with the aid of Van Kinsbergen's photographs. Subsequently, the temple became a subject of study among archaeologists such as Willem Frederik Stutterheim and Nicolaas Johannes Krom in 1923. In 1950 Johannes Gijsbertus de Casparis also studied the temple. Most of the archaeologists concurred that the temple was built in the first half of the ninth century. However, in 1960, inscription discovered in Perwara temple number 202 dated the year 792, meaning that the temple was constructed a few years earlier, in the late eighth century. Later in 1981, Jacques Dumarçay conducted a thorough research of the temple.

=== Contemporary events ===
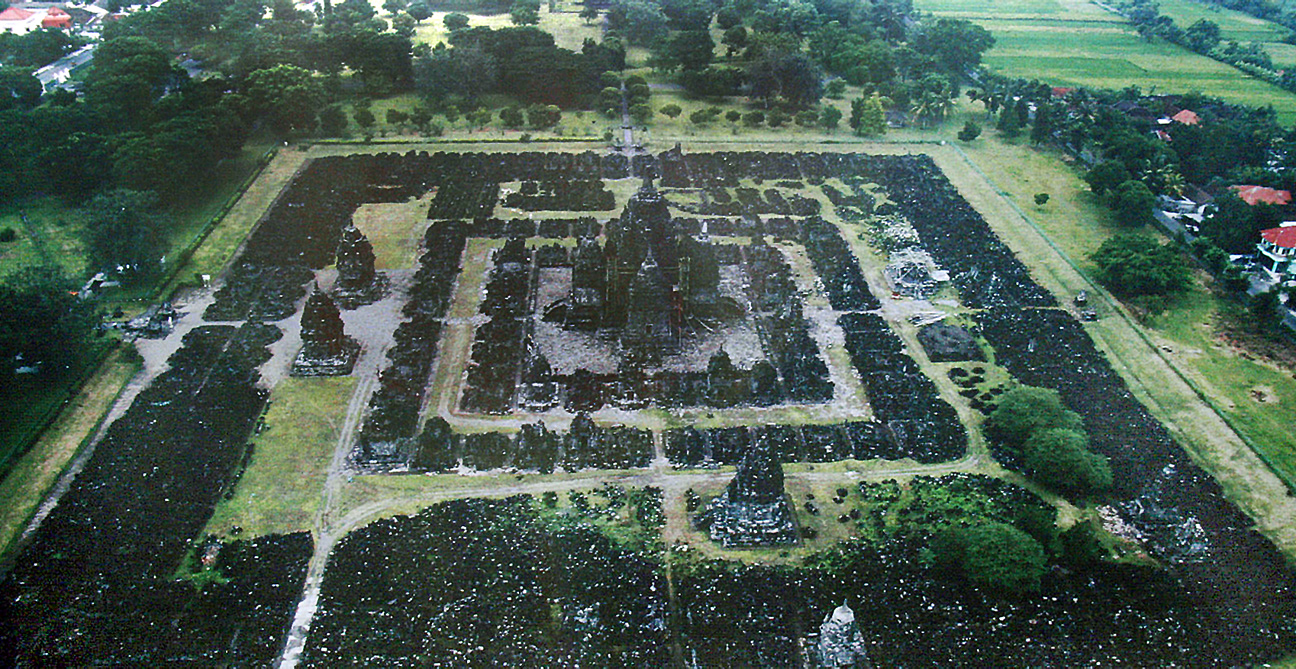
Aerial view of Sewu temple complex shows Mandala pattern

Since the early 20th century, the temple has been slowly and carefully reconstructed, yet it has not been completely restored. There are hundreds of temple ruins, and many stones are missing. The main temple reconstruction and two of the apit temples on the east side were completed in 1993 and inaugurated by President Soeharto on 20 February 1993.

The temple was severely damaged during the 2006 Yogyakarta earthquake. The structural damage was significant, and the central temple suffered the worst. Large pieces of debris were scattered about on the grounds, and cracks between stone blocks were detected. To prevent the central temple from collapsing, metal frame structures were erected on the four corners and attached to support the main temple. Although some weeks later in 2006, the site was reopened for visitors, the main temple remained closed for safety reasons. Today, the metal frame has been removed, and visitors may visit and enter the main temple.

The Sewu Temple often hosts the annual Waisak Day ceremony.

== The temple complex ==
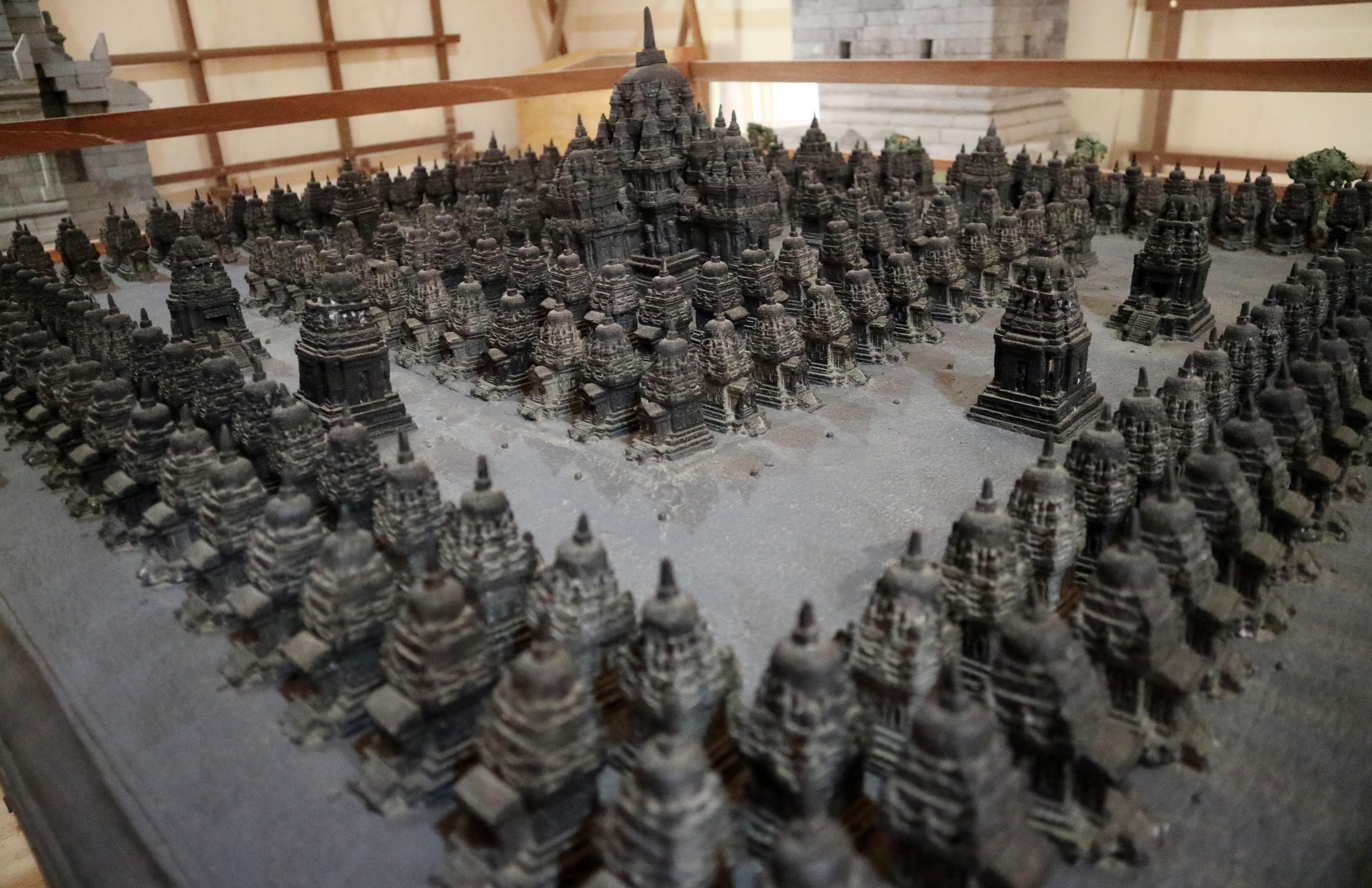
An architectural model of the Candi Sewu temple compound reconstructs the complete condition of the 8th-century Sewu temple in Central Java, Indonesia.

The Sewu temple complex is the largest Buddhist compound in the Prambanan area, with rectangular grounds that measure 185 meters north-south and 165 meters east-west. There is an entrance on all four cardinal points, but the main entrance is located on the east side. Each of the entrances is guarded by twin Dvarapala statues. These large guardian statues have been better preserved, and replicas can be found at Jogja Kraton. There are 249 buildings in the complex arranged in a Mandala pattern around the main central hall. This configuration expresses the Mahayana Buddhist view of the universe. There are 240 smaller temples, called Perwara (guardian) temples, with similar designs that are arranged in four rectangular concentric rows. The two outer rows are arranged closer and consist of 168 smaller temples, while the two inner rows, arranged at certain intervals, consist of 72 temples. The 249 temples located in the second precinct were all made with a square frame but varied by different statues and orientations. Many of the statues are now gone, and the arrangements on the current site are not in the original orientations. The statues are comparable to the statues of Borobudur and were likely made of bronze.

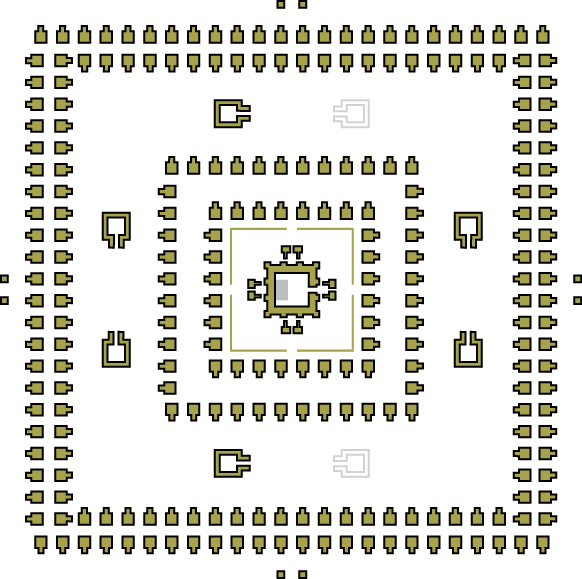
Candi Sewu Layout

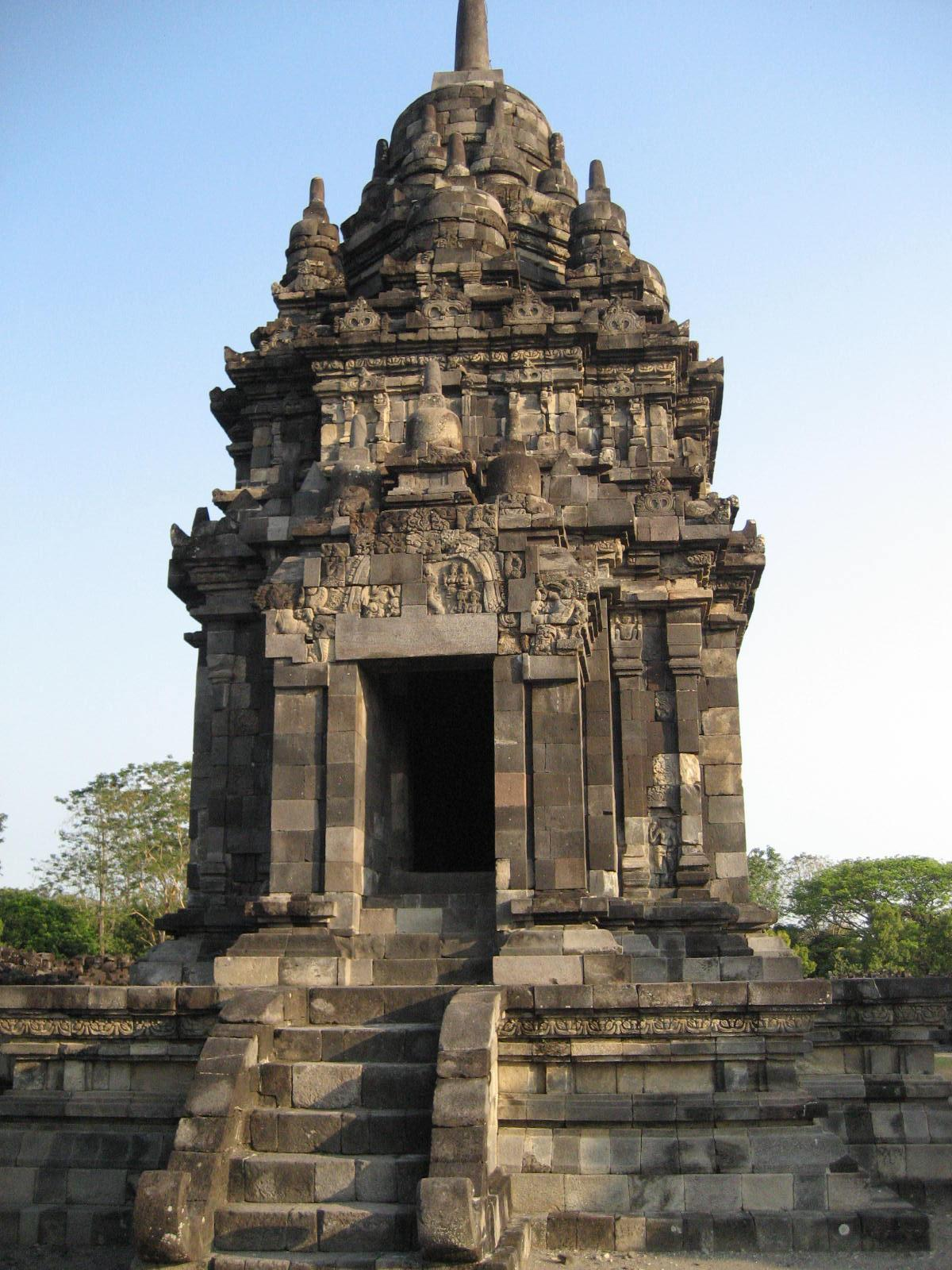
One of the apit temples in Candi Sewu

Along the north-south and east-west central axis at a distance of about 200 meters, between the second and third rows of the smaller temples, are located the apit (flank) temples, a couple on each cardinal point facing each other. The apit temples are the second largest temples after the main temple, however, only the eastern twin apit and a northern one remain today. These smaller temples encompass a larger sanctuary that has been heavily looted. Behind the fourth row of smaller temples lies the stone-paved courtyard where the main temple stood in the center.

The nearby temples, Gana temple in the east and Bubrah temple in the south, are suggested as part of the greater Manjusrigrha Vajradhatu mandala complex. Both temples are located around 300 metres from the Sewu main temple. There are northern and western ruins discovered around the same distance from the main temple, however, the stones were too scarce for reconstruction. These temples suggested that, indeed, the Sewu temple compound was completed with four additional temples, located 300 metres from the main temple, which corresponds with the mandala and the guardians of the directions concept.

== The main temple ==
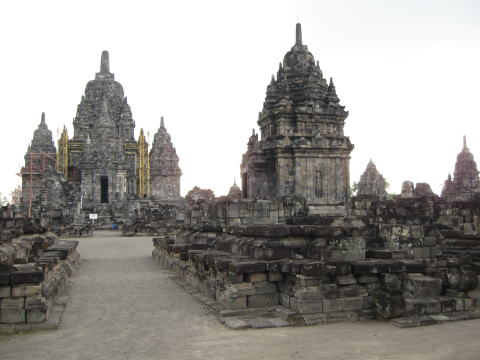
Candi Sewu's main temple at the left and one of apit temples at the right

The main temple measures 29 meters in diameter and soars up to 30 meters high. The ground plan of the main temple is a cross-shaped 20-sided polygon. On each of the four cardinal points of the main temple, there are four structures projected outward, each with its stairs, entrances, and rooms, crowned with stupas, which form a cross-like layout. All of the structures are made from andesite stones.

The main temple has five rooms, one large garbhagriha in the center and four smaller rooms in each cardinal direction. These four rooms are all connected by outer corner galleries with balustrades bordered by rows of small stupas. From the findings during the reconstruction process, it was suggested that the original design of the central sanctuary only consisted of a central roomed temple surrounded by four additional structures with open portals. Doorways were added later. The portals were narrowed to create door frames on which to attach wooden doors. Some of the holes to attach doors are still visible. The doorways join the temples together into one main building with five rooms.

The central chamber can be reached from the eastern room. The central chamber is larger than other rooms, with a higher ceiling and a taller roof. Now, all five rooms are empty. However, the lotus-carved stone pedestal in the central chamber suggests that the temple once contained a large bronze Buddhist statue (possibly the bronze statue of Manjusri), probably reaching a height of four meters. The statue is missing, probably looted for scrap metal over the centuries. However, another theory suggested that the main statue was probably constructed from several stone blocks coated with vajralepa plaster.

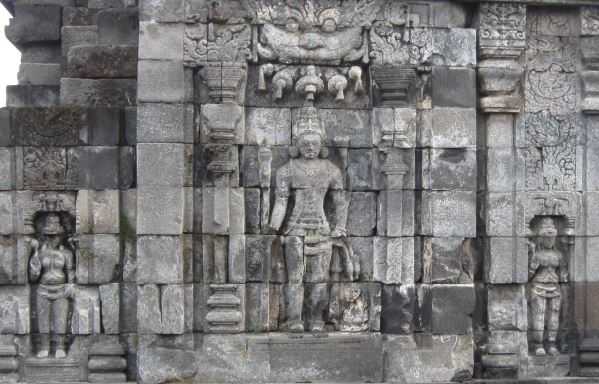
The images of Boddhisattva on the wall of perwara temple

== See also ==
- Buddhism in Indonesia
- Candi of Indonesia
- Indonesian Esoteric Buddhism
- Manjusrigrha inscription (792)
- Bubrah
