= Avalokiteshvara of Chaiya =

Artefact in Bangkok National Museum

Avalokiteshvara
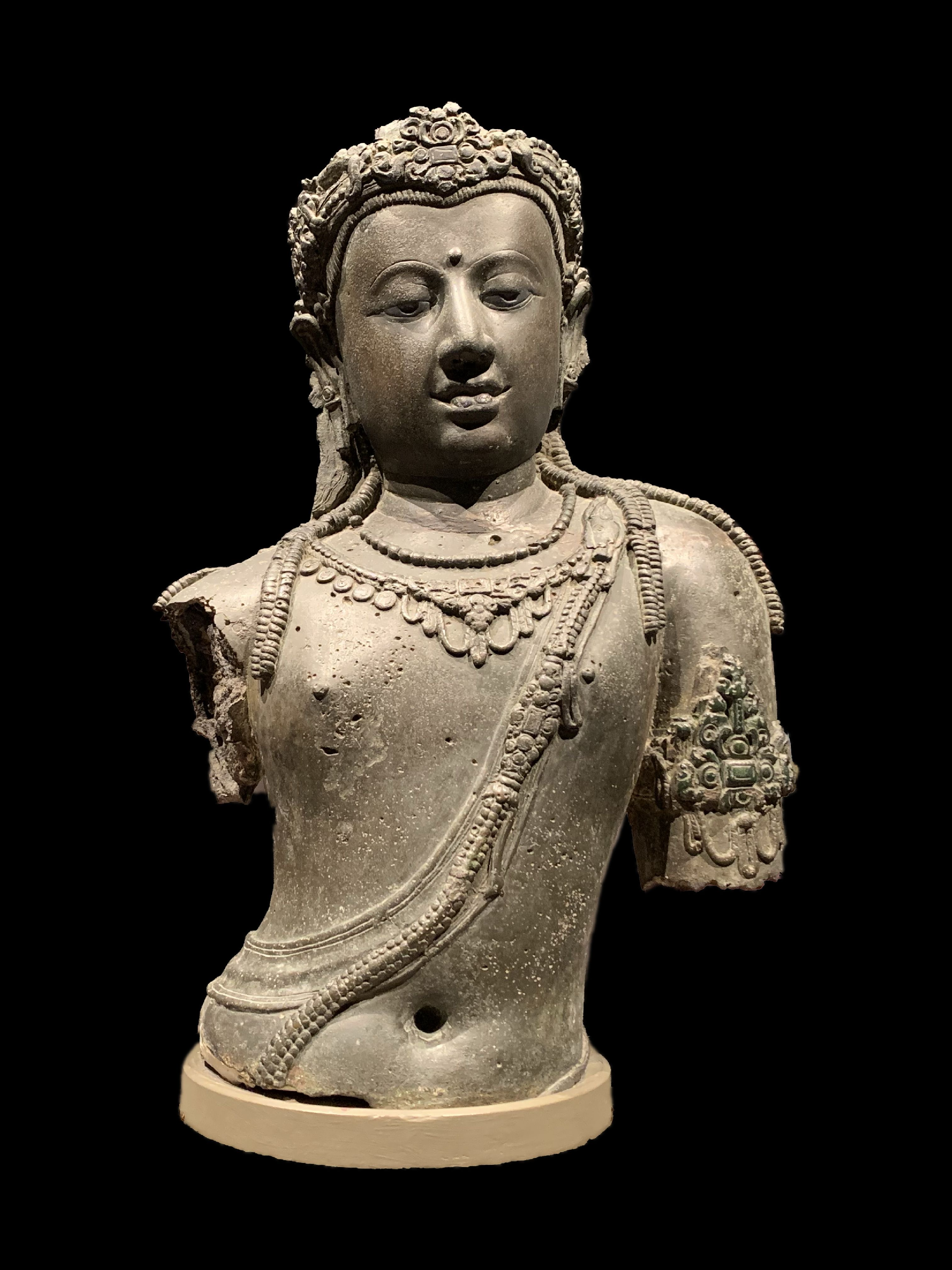
- Material: bronze
- Height: 63 cm (25 in)
- Created: 7th-8th century
- Period/culture: Srivijaya
- Discovered: 1905; Chaiya District, Surat Thani Province
- Discovered by: Damrong Rajanubhab
- Present location: Bangkok National Museum, Phra Nakhon District, Bangkok, Thailand

Bronze Torso of Avalokiteshavara is a Srivijaya-era bronze torso depicting Avalokiteshvara, a Bodhisattava in Buddhism. It was discovered in Chaiya District, Surat Thani Province in southern Thailand and is currently in a collection of Bangkok National Museum. It is one of the most beautiful and most widely recognised sculptures of Avalokiteshavara in Thailand.

== Design ==
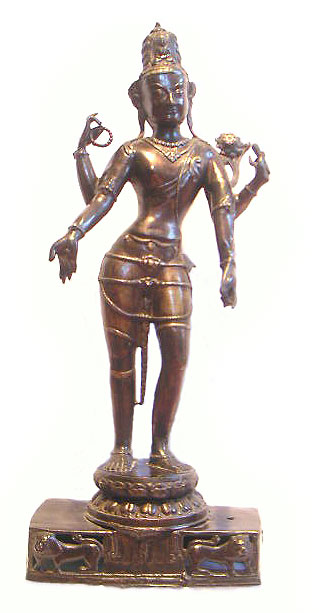
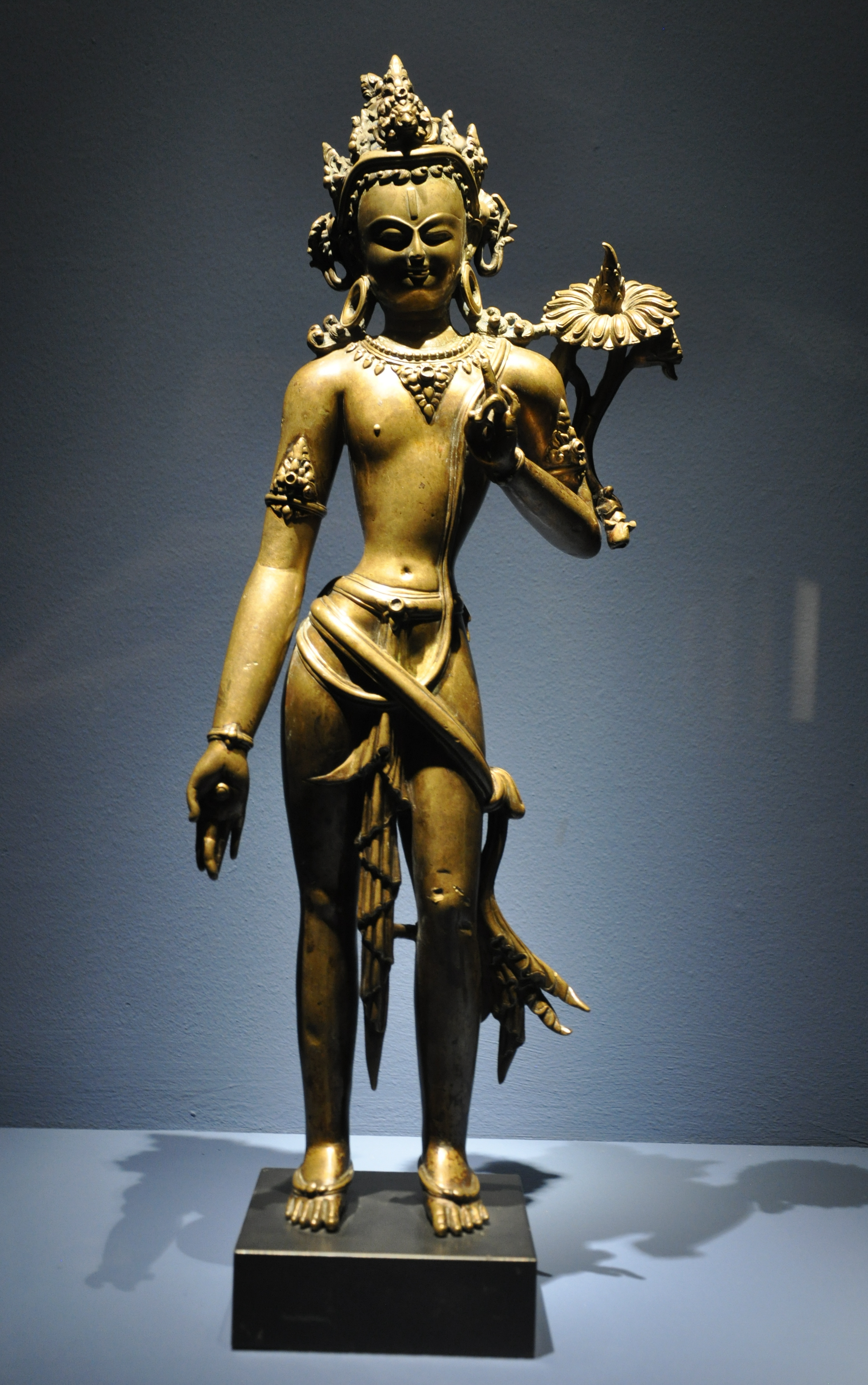
Some of the full-bodied Avalokiteshvara elsewhere which the torso may originally looked like

The torso depicts a humanoid figure slightly inclining with a round face and eyes looking downwards. The headwear was partially lost. The figure is decorated with prakham (beads), necklaces, and phahurat (upper-arm-wear). A cloth chiang ba can be founded put on one of the shoulder, decorated with a dear-headed yajyopavit beads.

According to information provided by the Fine Arts Department, the torso shares similarities with a sculpture of Agastya from Candi Banon in Central Java, Indonesia. The torso is identified as a work of Srivijaya art, influenced by post-Gupta-Pala art of India. It was possibly created somewhere in Chaiya or other towns within the Kingdom, spanning from modern-day Thailand to the Java island in Indonesia.

== History ==
=== Discovery ===
The artefact was discovered in 1905 by Damrong Rajanubhab at Wat Phra Borommathat Chaiya (or Wat Wiang, according to some sources) in Chaiya District, Surat Thani Province. According to a letter written by Narisara Nuwattiwong, the torso was founded near an outer wall to the northeast. A historian Manit Valliphodom (มานิต วัลลิโภดม) suspected unidentified boxes drawn in the temple's map, near the Phra Sila Daeng Sam Ong vihāra, from the aforementioned letter to be the discovery location. Buddhadasa wrote that once Damrong Rajanubhab noticed the torso from his seat on the elephant, he "leaped and rushed for the statue before the elephant even stopped for him" and "took the statue up by himself". Once he presented it to King Chulalongkorn in Bangkok, the King "looked [at the torso] excitedly" and "said excitedly [to Damrong]; 'What, what, Damrong.'"

The torso was since located in the Grand Palace, Bangkok until King Prajadhipok gave it to the Bangkok National Museum.

=== Identification ===
The Fine Arts Department hypothesised that the torso was the statue mentioned in Wat Sema Mueang inscription (the 23rd inscription) which was dated to 775 CE. The inscription describes the greatness of Srivijaya King Dharma Seta. One section of it cited that the king had built three prasats to enshrine and revere three Buddhist figures; one for the Gautama Buddha himself, and two for two Bodhisattavas: Vajrapānī (the one who holds a vajra), and Padmapānī (the one who holds a lotus). The torso was possibly of the latter Bodhisattva, Padmapānī; also known as Avalokiteshvara and was widely revered in Mahāyāna and Vajrayāna sects of Buddhism prevalence in the area at the time.

== Association with Buddhadasa ==
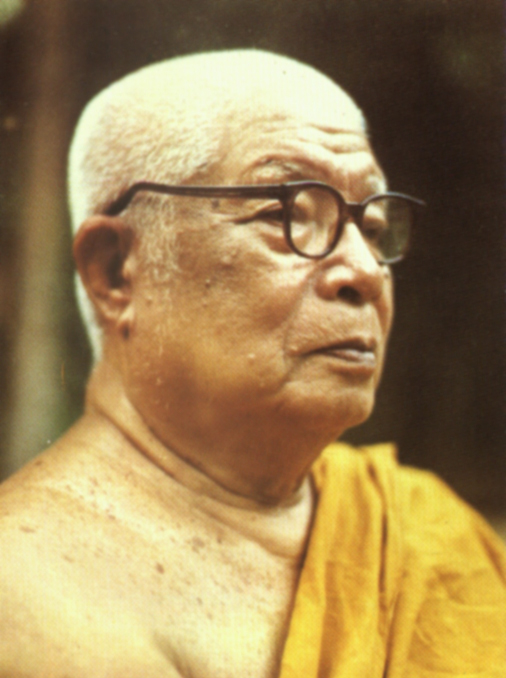
Buddhadasa

An influential Thai Buddhist monk Buddhadasa is highly associated with this Avalokiteshvara torso. It is also the main symbol of his temple-park complex Suan Mokkh.

In 1943, Indapañño (ordaining name of Buddhadasa) was called in to meet Damrong Rajanubhab at Varadis Palace in Bangkok to discuss about archeological findings in Chaiya. Damrong presented the Avalokiteshvara torso to him for the first time. Indapañño looked at the torso "with bemusement" as he "had never seen such beautiful [Buddharupa] like this." The beauty of the torso turned his "chit calm", as the face of the torso was "overwhelmed with compassion (mettā)." Indapañño once wrote:

The face of this Avalokiteshvara pratimā shows the paññā, mettā, and khanti. It is such an amazing piece. It could be seen as a figure with purified mind, or with the top paññā, or with overwhelming compassion (mettā), or with excellent patience. The artist who created this pratimā was such an excellent [artist]. In order to execute such work, the artist must had been a very good-minded and very calm person who also knew a lot about dharma and was very proficient in sculpting.

— Buddhadasa, on Suan Mokkh (1998)

It is often regarded that Indapañño's interest in archaeology and history of southern Thailand could be attributed to his initial impression with this torso. So much so that he was later appointed as the chief of the National Museum for Surat Thani Province.

He ordered a monk Phra Kovid Khemānanda (พระโกวิท เขมานันทะ) to create a replica of the Avalokiteshvara torso to be placed in his Suan Mokkh He has the statue "...[to be] placed in an easily-noticed location [so that] whenever you have dukkha or krodha; looking at the Avalokiteshvara will help your mind to clear up." "Being used as such, looking at the face to make you pleasant," he added.
