= Mondop =

Thai traditional religious building form

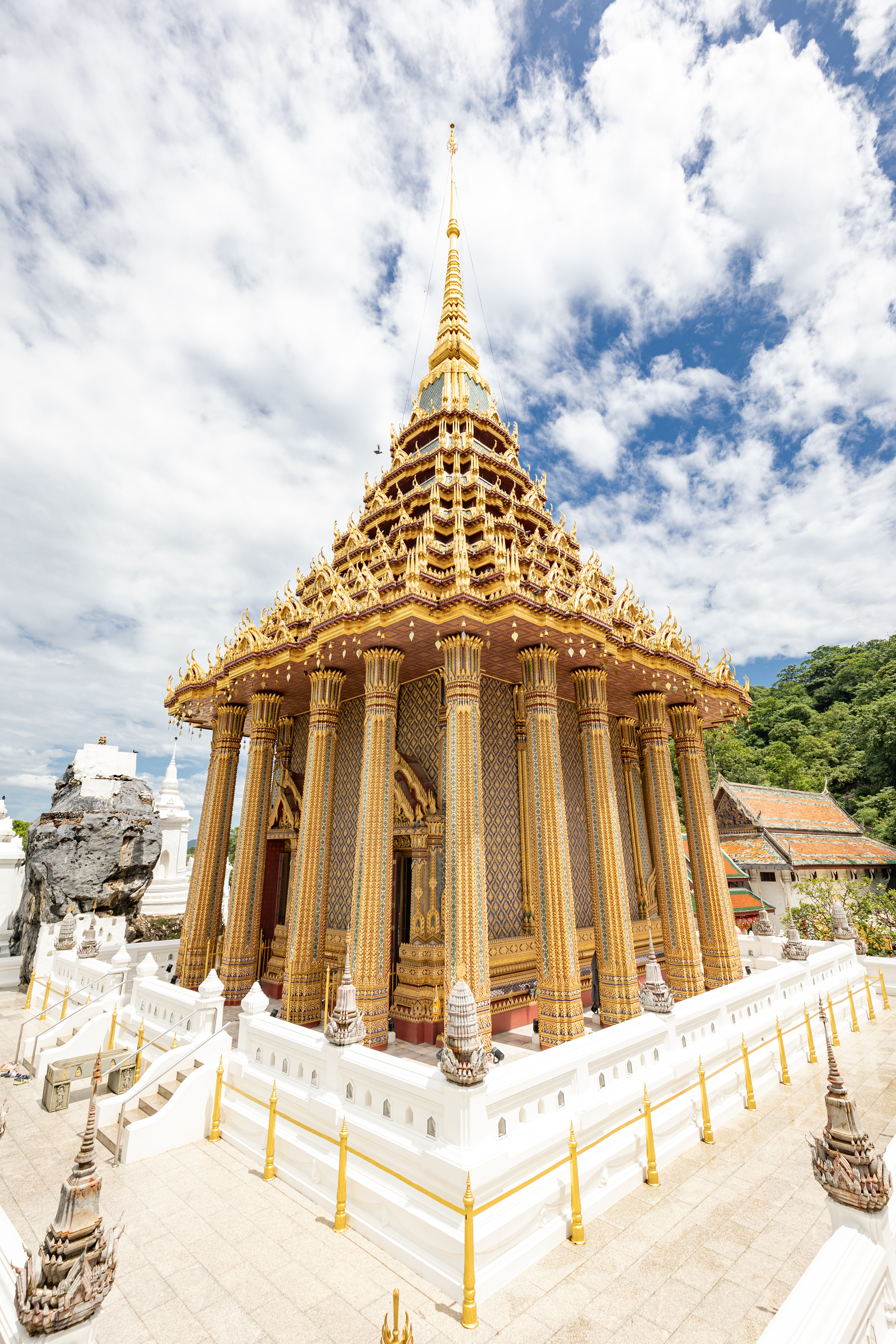
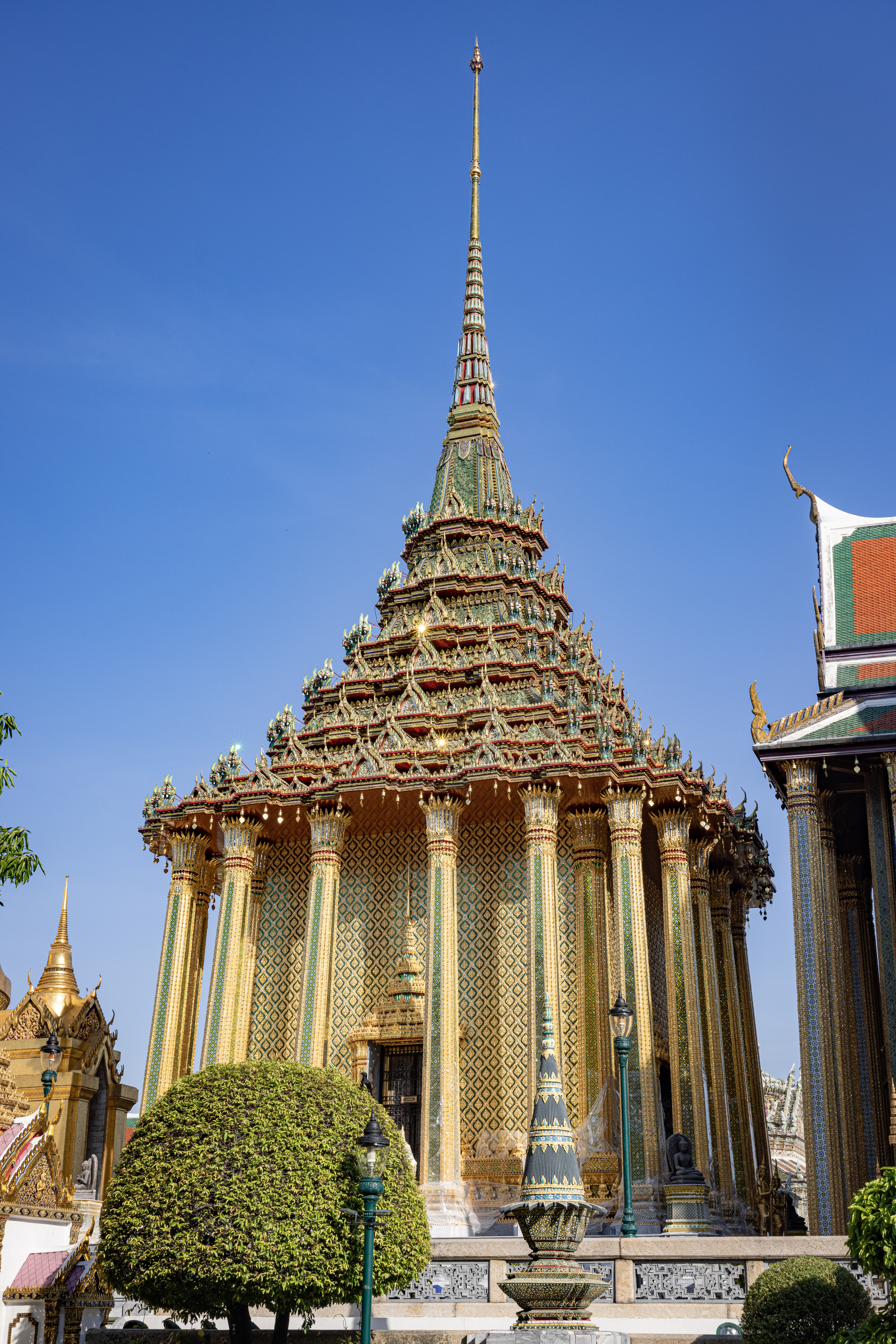
Phra Mondop at Wat Phra Phutthabat; Wat Phra Kaew

The mondop (Thai: มณฑป, from Pali/Sanskrit maṇḍapa) is a building form in traditional Thai religious architecture featuring a square or cruciform building with a usually pointed roof. In the narrow sense, it refers to an enclosed square building with a roughly pyramidal, multi-tiered roof culminating in a tall pointed spire, with a roof structure very similar to the smaller busabok. In the wider sense, the term may refer to religious buildings following a wide range of architectural styles, including historical structures more closely reflecting the Indic mandapa, from which they are likely derived.

Mondop may be used for various functions, including as scripture halls (ho trai) and for housing religious artefacts. Prominent examples include the library (Phra Mondop) at Wat Phra Kaew in Bangkok and the mondop covering the Buddha footprint at Wat Phra Phutthabat in Saraburi. The pointed roof structure can be found incorporated in the prasat architectural form, where it crowns a usually cruciform, gabled roof.
