= Prasat (Thai architecture) =

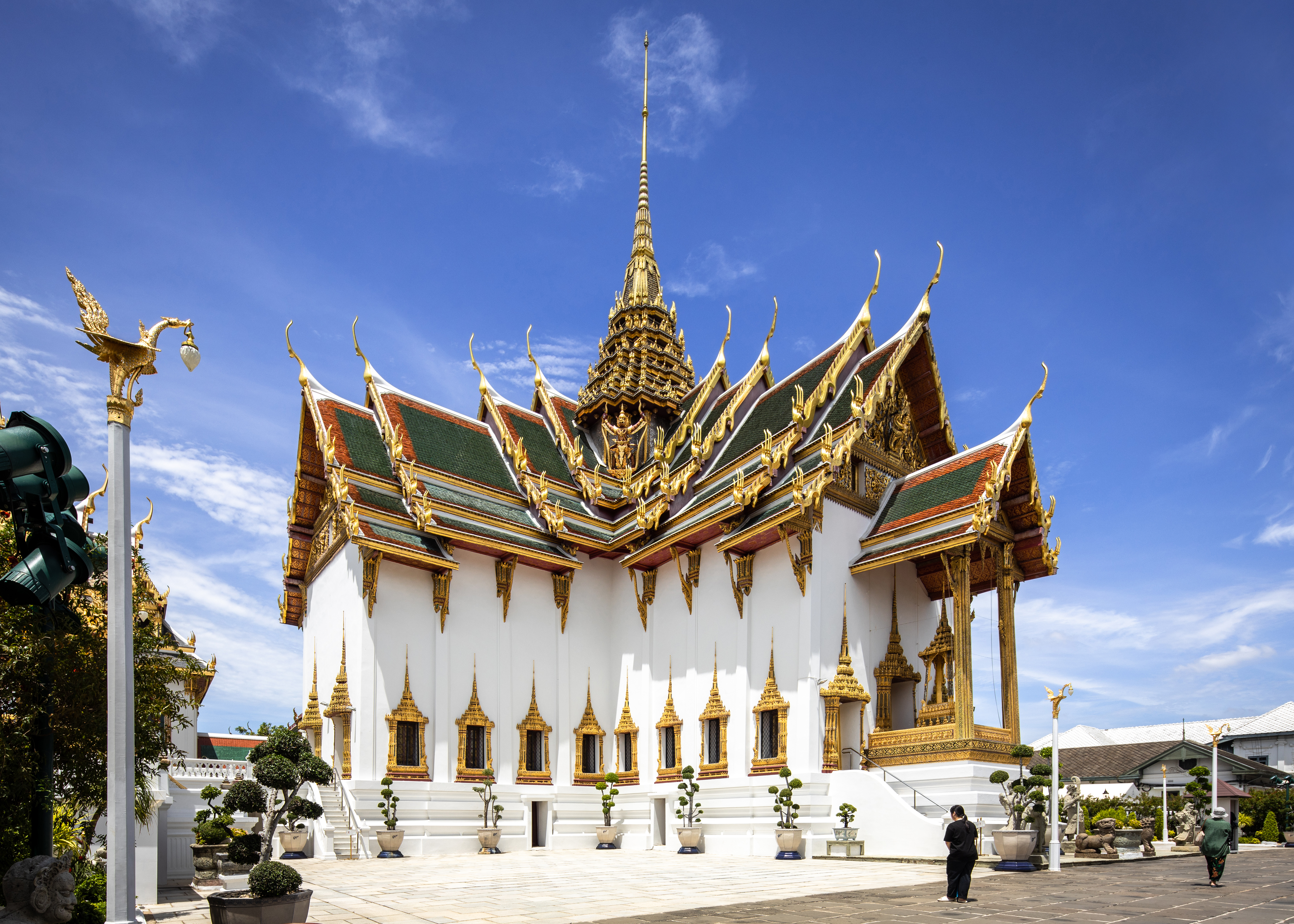
The Dusit Maha Prasat Throne Hall in the Grand Palace is a prominent example of the prasat form.

A prasat (Thai: ปราสาท, from Sanskrit: prāsāda), or more accurately, kudakhan (กุฎาคาร, from Pali/Sanskrit: kūṭāgāra) or rueanyot (เรือนยอด), is a Thai architectural form reserved for royal palaces of the monarch or for sacred religious structures. It is a building featuring an ornate roof structure, usually multi-tiered, with one or more spires. The form symbolizes the centre of the universe, which is traditionally associated with the monarch or the Buddha. Prasat forms are widely used in the buildings of the Grand Palace, and are also found in some Buddhist temples (wat) and in the architecture of the temporary crematoria used for royal funerals.

Architectural historians have classified kudakhan into several categories, according to the shape of the spire: mondop-shaped, prang-shaped, mongkut-shaped, and others (including stupa-shaped and phra kiao–shaped, depending on the author).

== Gallery ==
=== Mondop-shaped ===
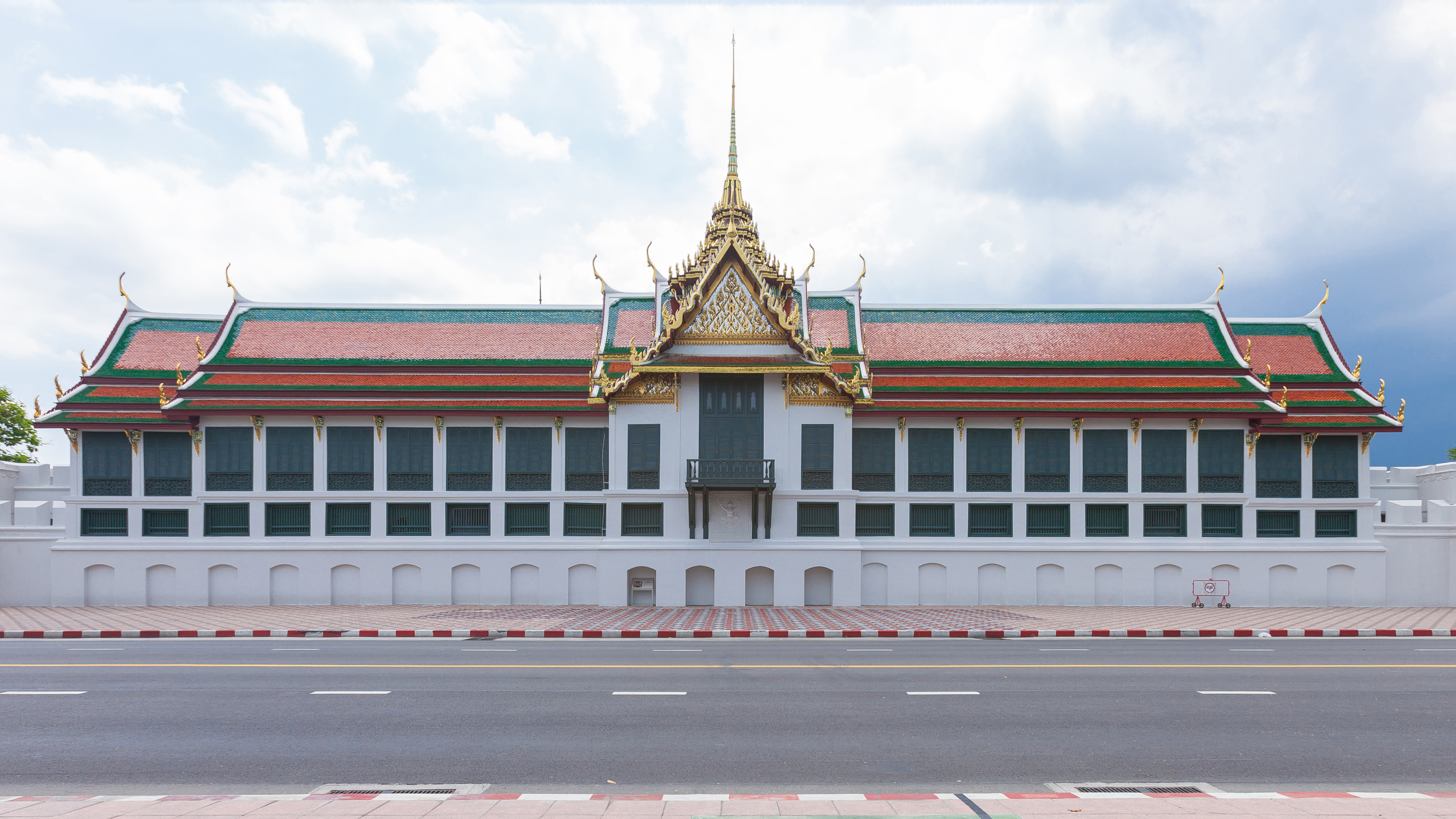
Sutthaisawan Prasat Throne Hall, Grand Palace

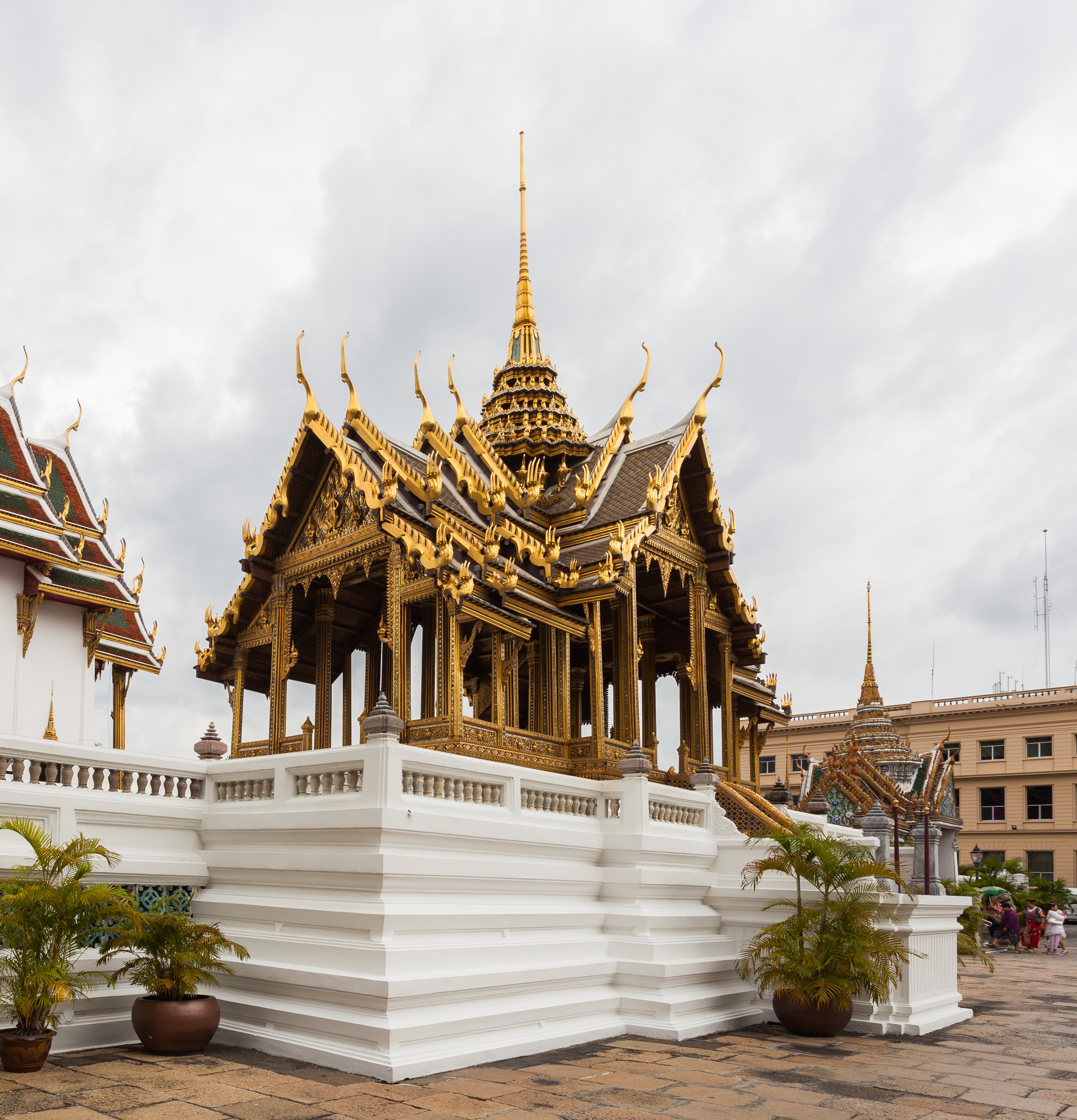
Aphon Phimok Prasat Pavilion, Grand Palace

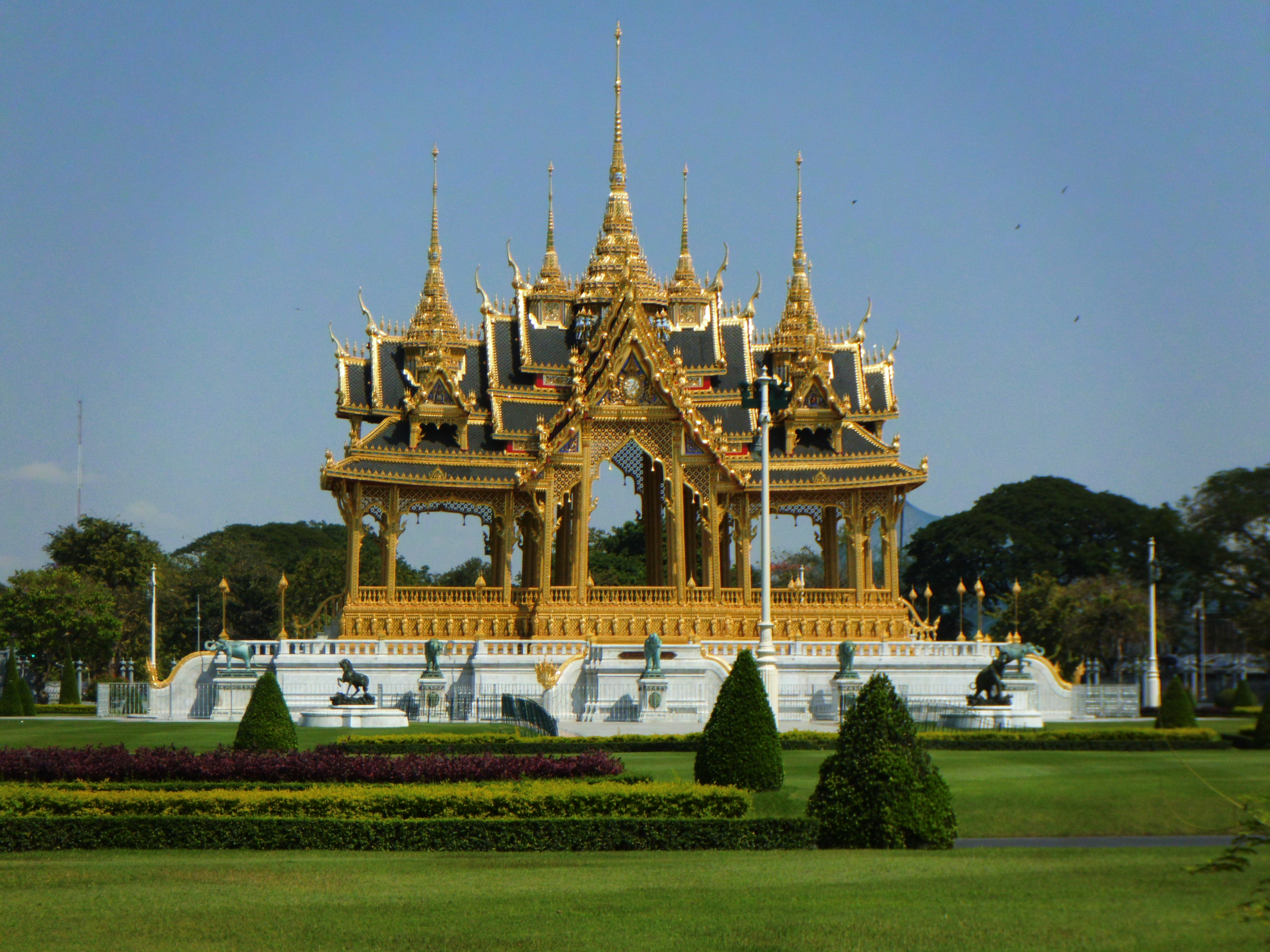
Rueanyot Borom Mangkhalanusorani, Dusit Palace

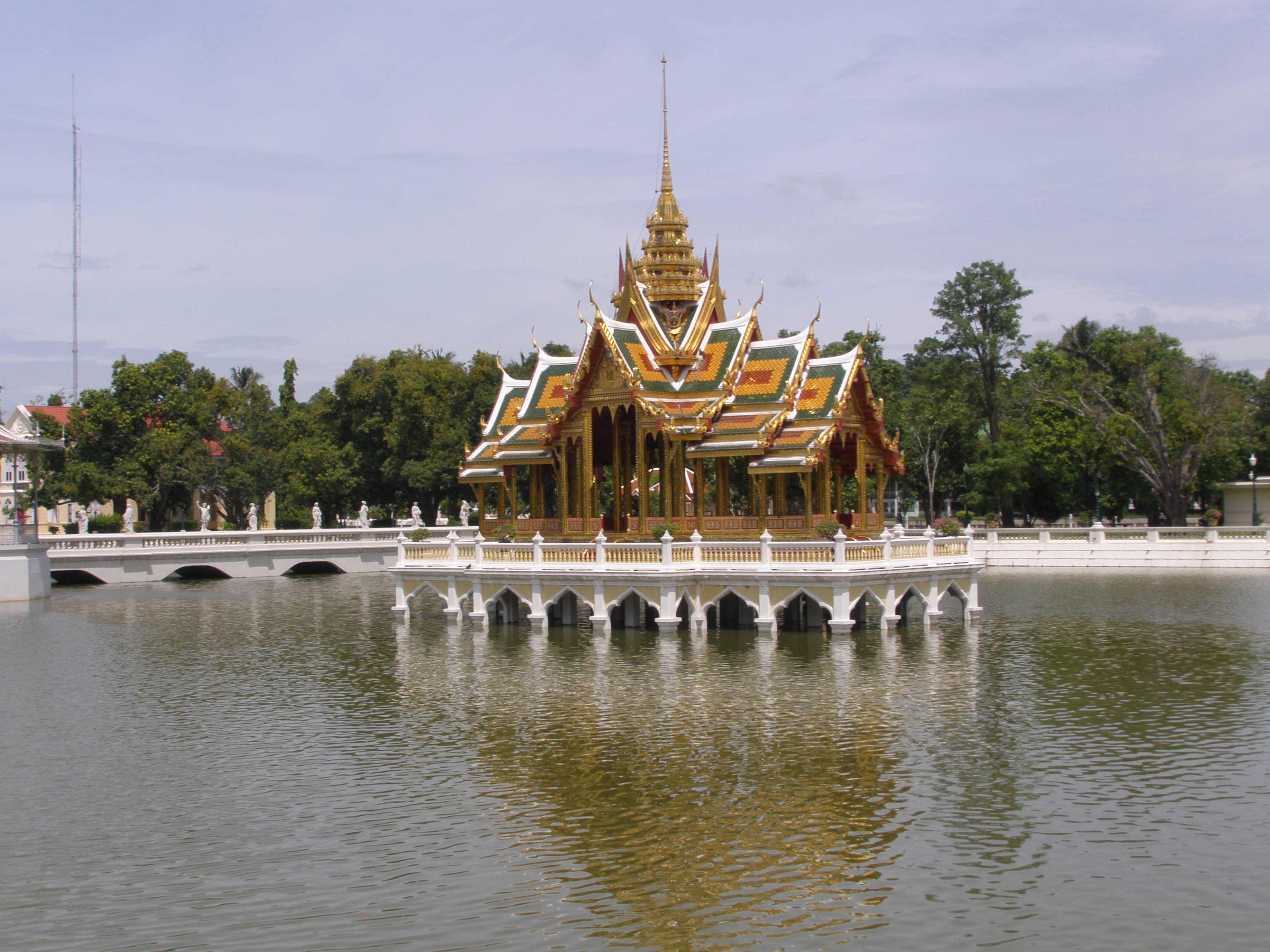
Aisawan Thipphaya-at Pavilion, Bang Pa-in Palace

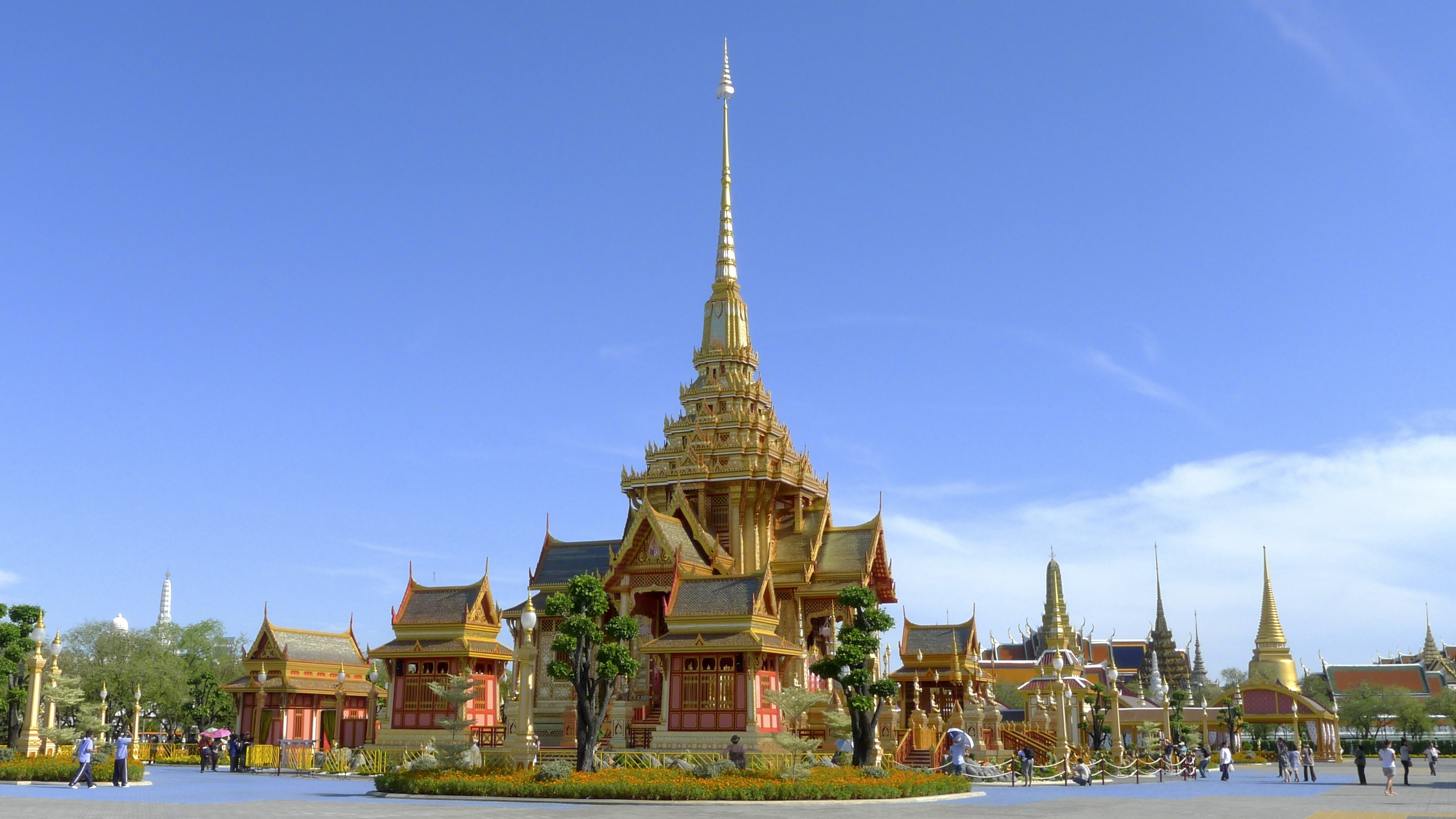
Royal crematorium of Princess Bejaratana

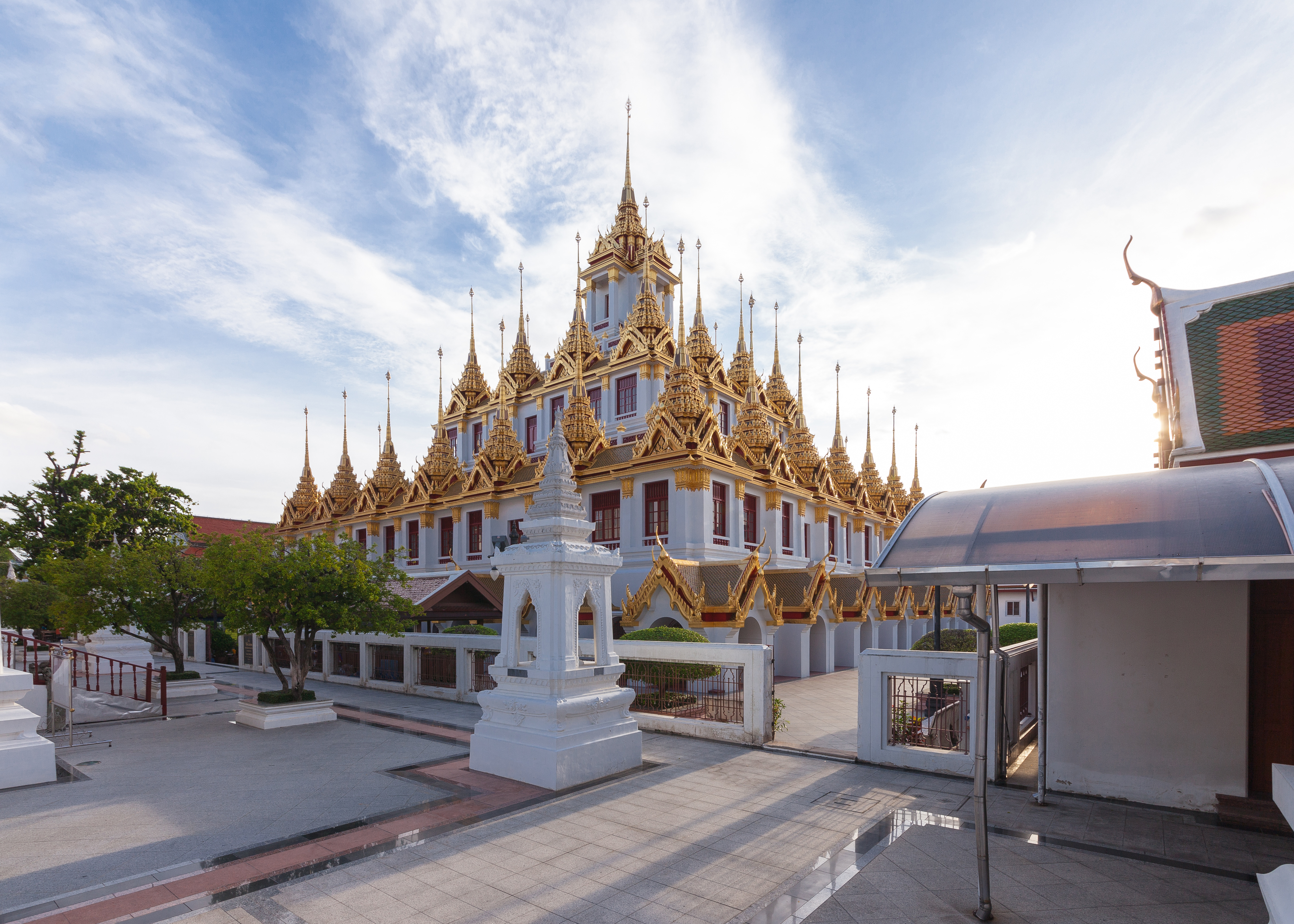
Loha Prasat, Wat Ratchanatdaram

=== Prang-shaped ===
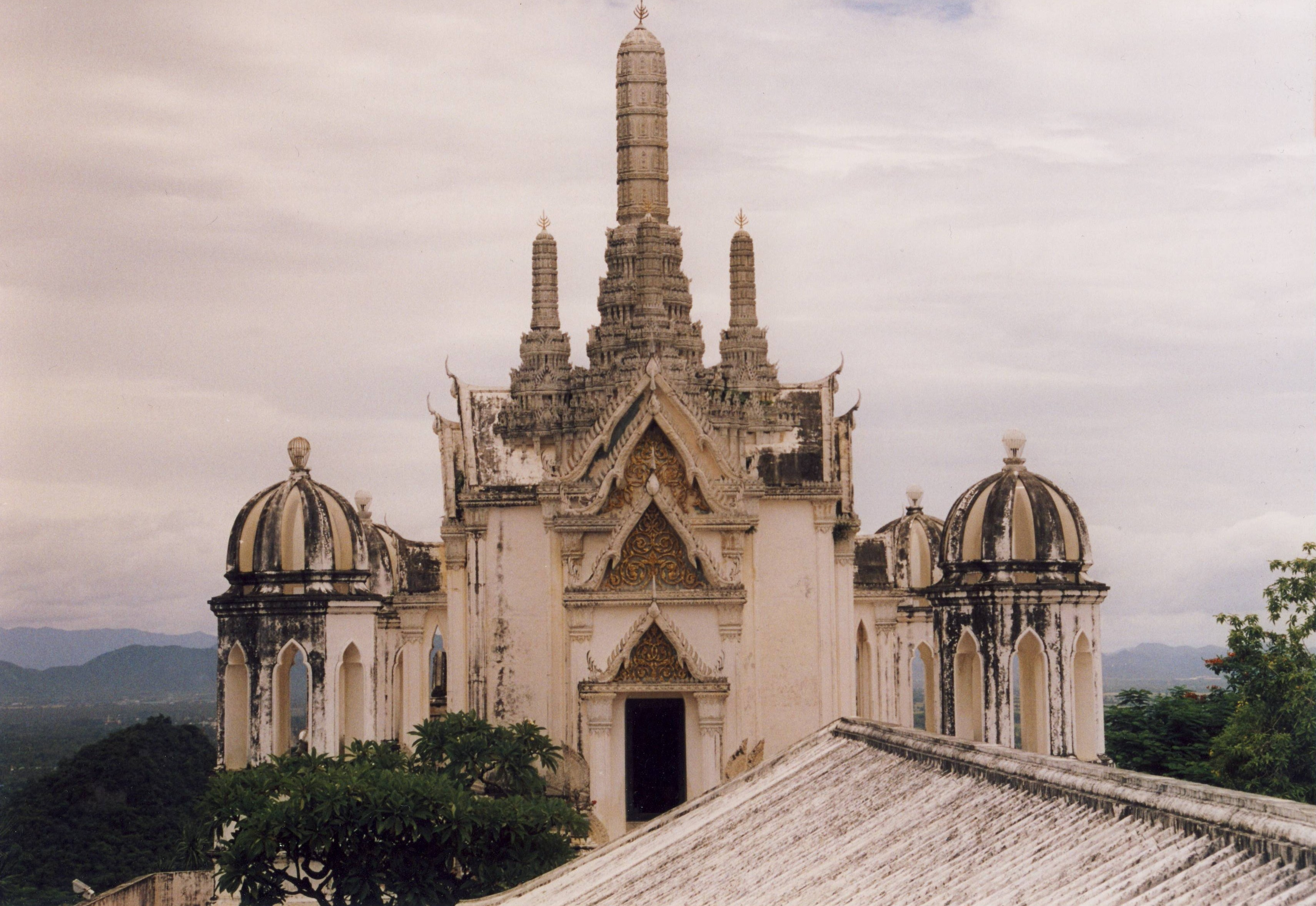
Wetchayan Wichian Prasat Throne Hall, Phra Nakhon Khiri

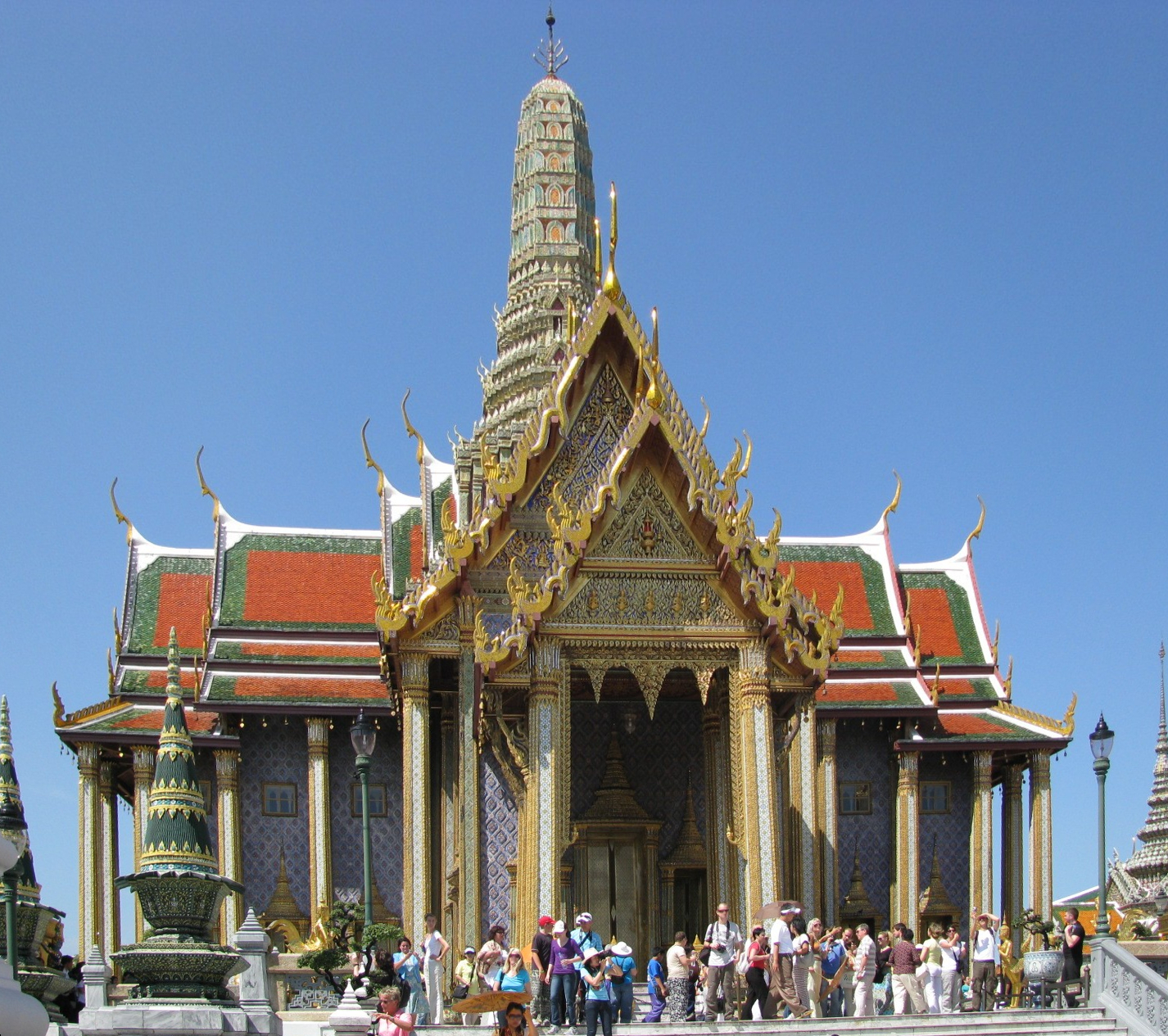
Prasat Phra Thep Bidon, Wat Phra Kaew

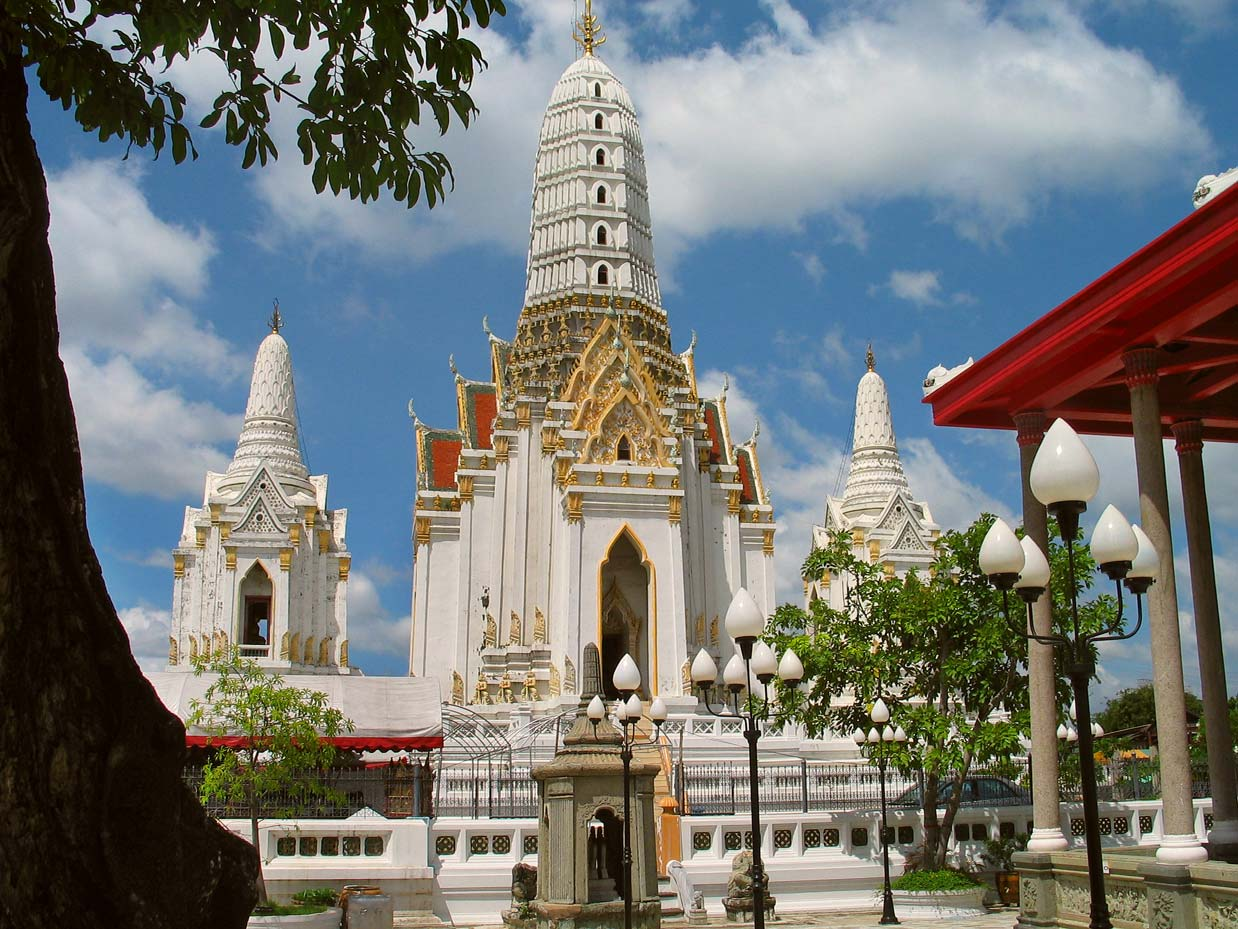
Wat Phichayayatikaram

=== Mongkut-shaped ===
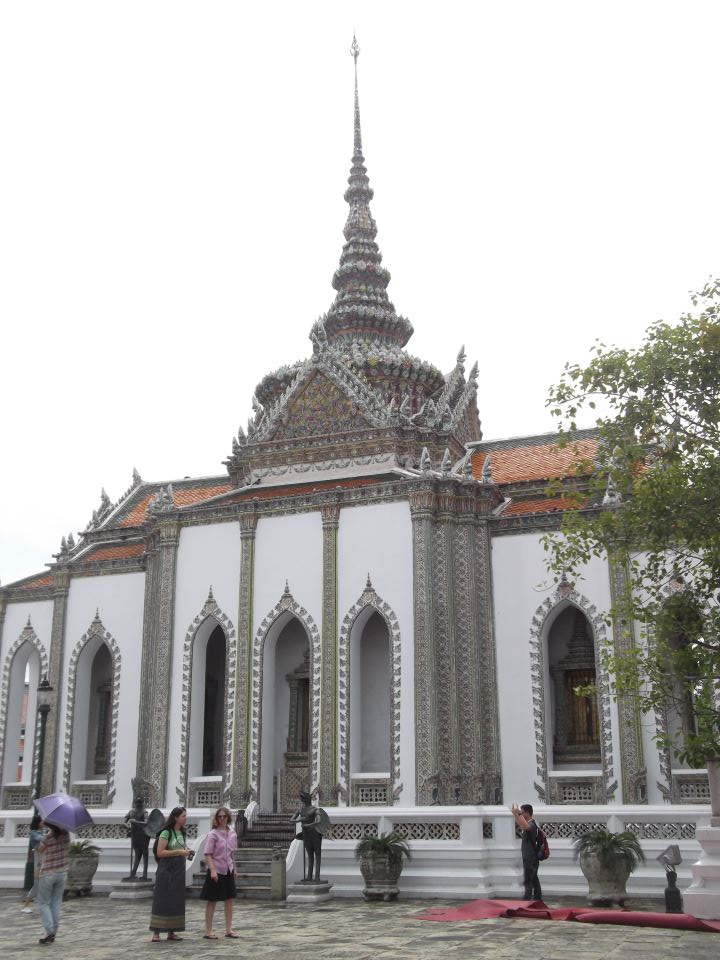
Wihan Yot, Wat Phra Kaew

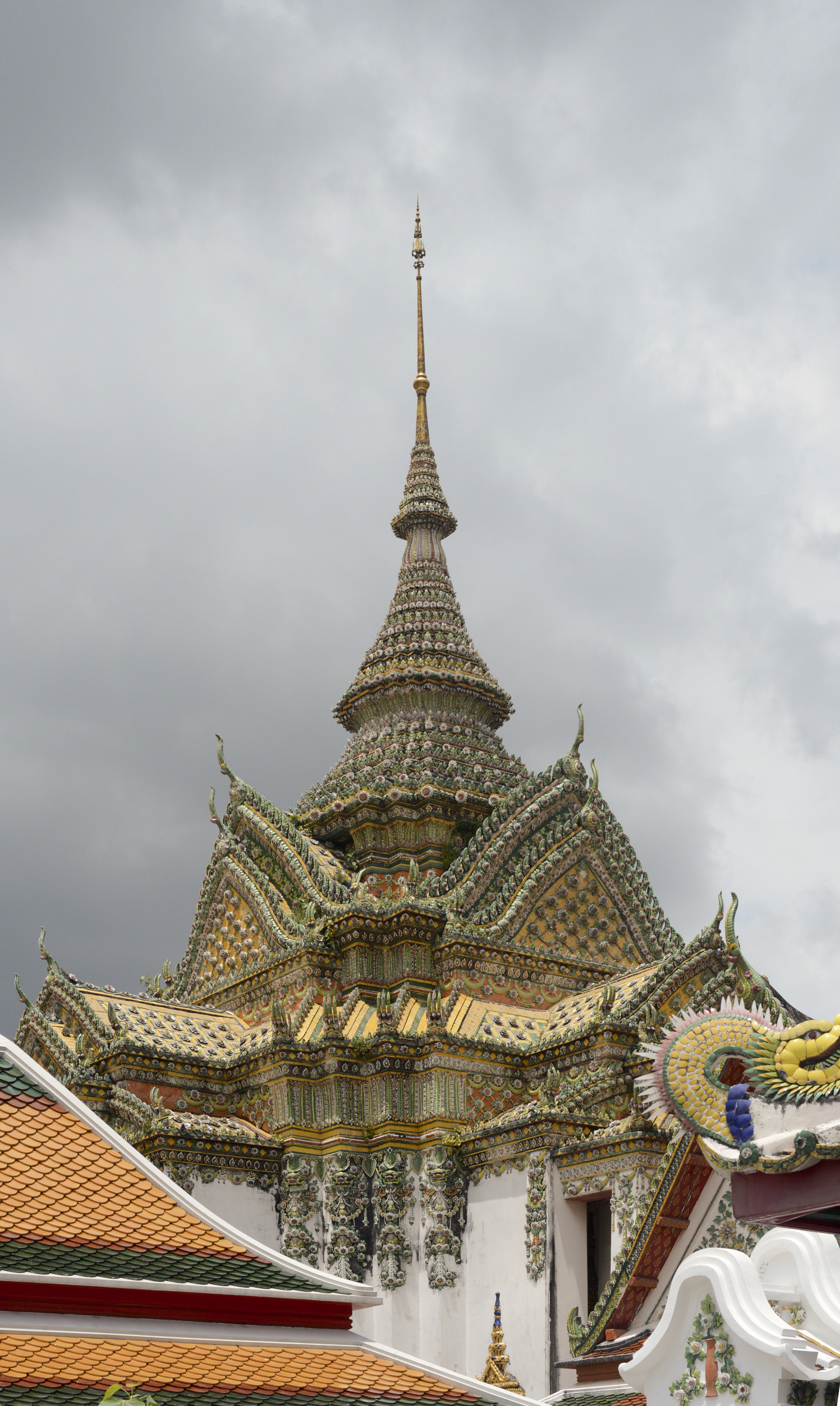
Phra Mondop, Wat Pho

== See also ==
- Pyatthat – Burmese equivalent
