= Wat Phra Borommathat Chaiya =

Buddhist temple in Thailand

Wat Phra Borommathat Chaiya Ratchaworawihan
- วัดพระบรมธาตุไชยาราชวรวิหาร
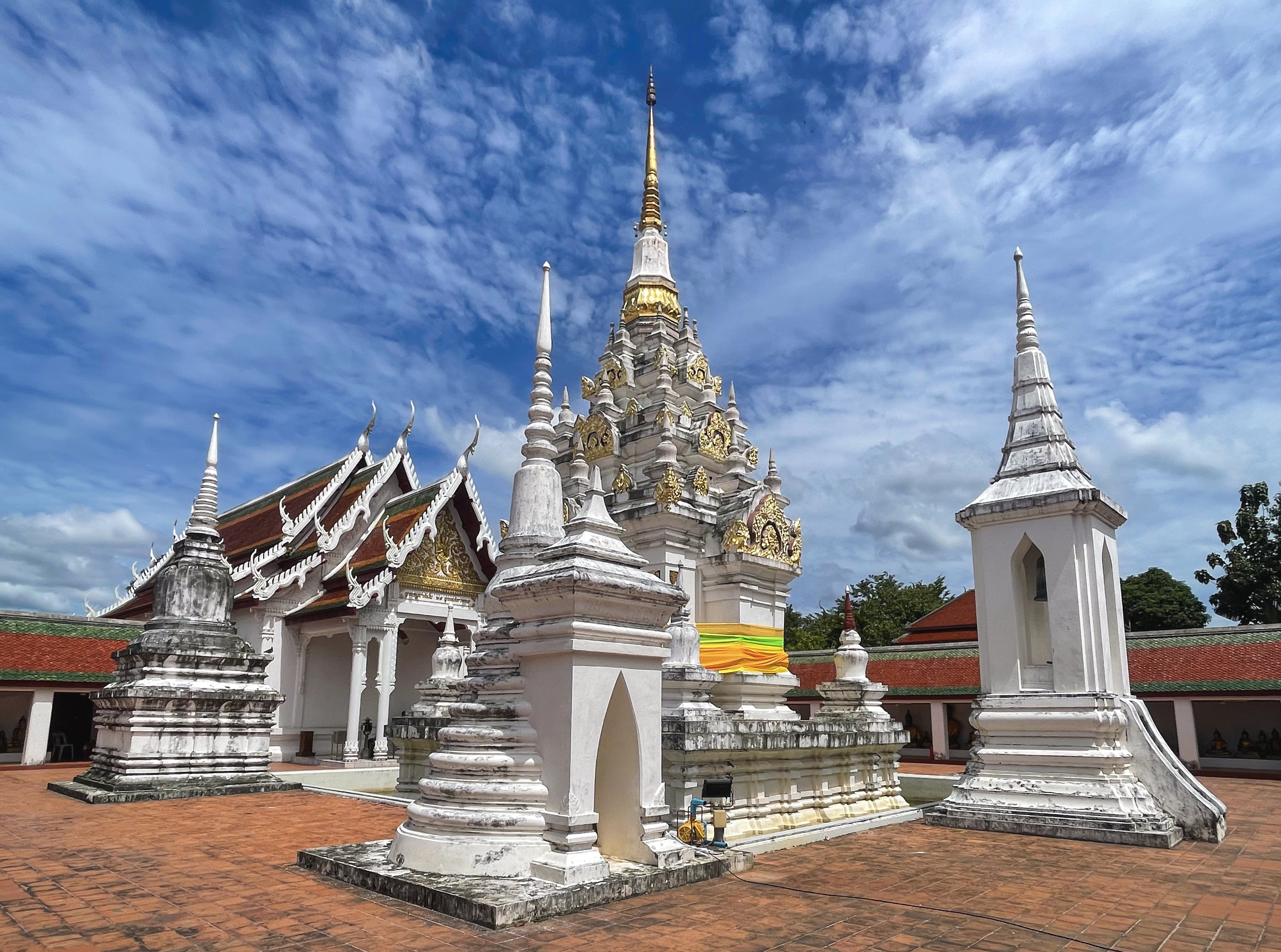

Religion
- Affiliation: Buddhist
- Sect: Theravāda
- Status: First-class royal temple

Location
- Location: Chaiya, Surat Thani
- Country: Thailand
- Interactive map of Wat Phra Borommathat Chaiya Ratchaworawihan
- Coordinates: 9°23′05″N 99°11′03″E

Wat Phra Borommathat Chaiya Ratchaworawihan (Thai: วัดพระบรมธาตุไชยาราชวรวิหาร) is a first-class royal temple in Chaiya, Surat Thani, Thailand.
