= Candi of Indonesia =

Hindu and Buddhist temples and sanctuaries in Indonesia

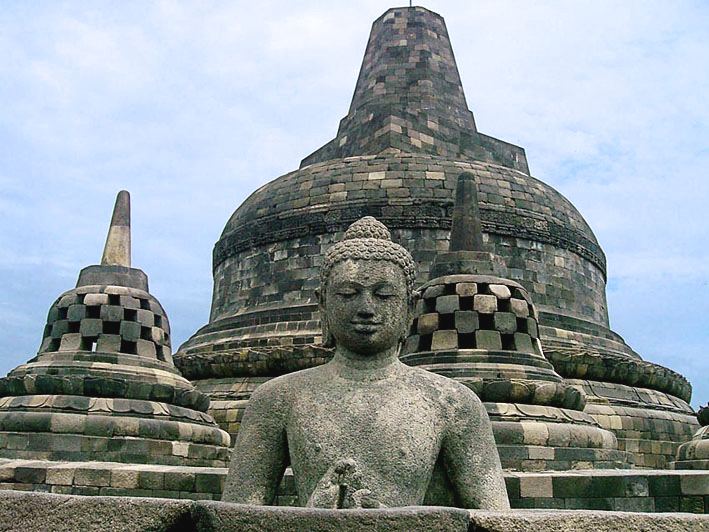
Buddha in an open stupa and the main stupa of Borobudur in the background

A candi (from Kawi caṇḍi, pronounced [tʃandi]) is a Hindu or Buddhist temple in Indonesia, mostly built during the so-called "Hindu-Buddhist period" between the 4th and 15th centuries.

The Kamus Besar Bahasa Indonesia defines a candi as an ancient stone building used for worship, or for storing the ashes of cremated Hindu or Buddhist kings and priests. Indonesian archaeologists describe candis as sacred structures of Hindu and Buddhist heritage, used for religious rituals and ceremonies in Indonesia. However, ancient secular structures such as gates, urban ruins, pools and bathing places are often called candi too, while a shrine that specifically serves as a tomb is called a cungkup.

In Hindu Balinese architecture, the term candi refers to a stone or brick structure of single-celled shrine with portico, entrance and stairs, topped with pyramidal roof and located within a pura. It is often modeled after East Javanese temples, and functions as a shrine to a specific deity. To the Balinese, a candi is not necessarily ancient, since candis continue to be (re-)built within these puras, such as the reconstructed temple in Alas Purwo, Banyuwangi.

In the contemporary Indonesian Buddhist perspective, candi also refers to a shrine, either ancient or new. Several contemporary viharas in Indonesia, for example, contain actual-size replicas or reconstructions of famous Buddhist temples, such as the replica of Pawon and Plaosan's perwara (ancillary) temples. In Buddhism, the role of a candi as a shrine is sometimes interchangeable with a stupa, a domed structure to store Buddhist relics or the ashes of cremated Buddhist priests, patrons or benefactors. Borobudur, Muara Takus and Batujaya, for example, are actually elaborate stupas.

In the modern Indonesian language, the term candi can be translated as a "temple" or similar structure, especially belonging to the Hindu and Buddhist faiths. Thus, temples in Cambodia (such as the Angkor Wat), Champa (Central and Southern Vietnam), Thailand, Laos, Myanmar and India are also called candi in Indonesian.

== Terminology ==
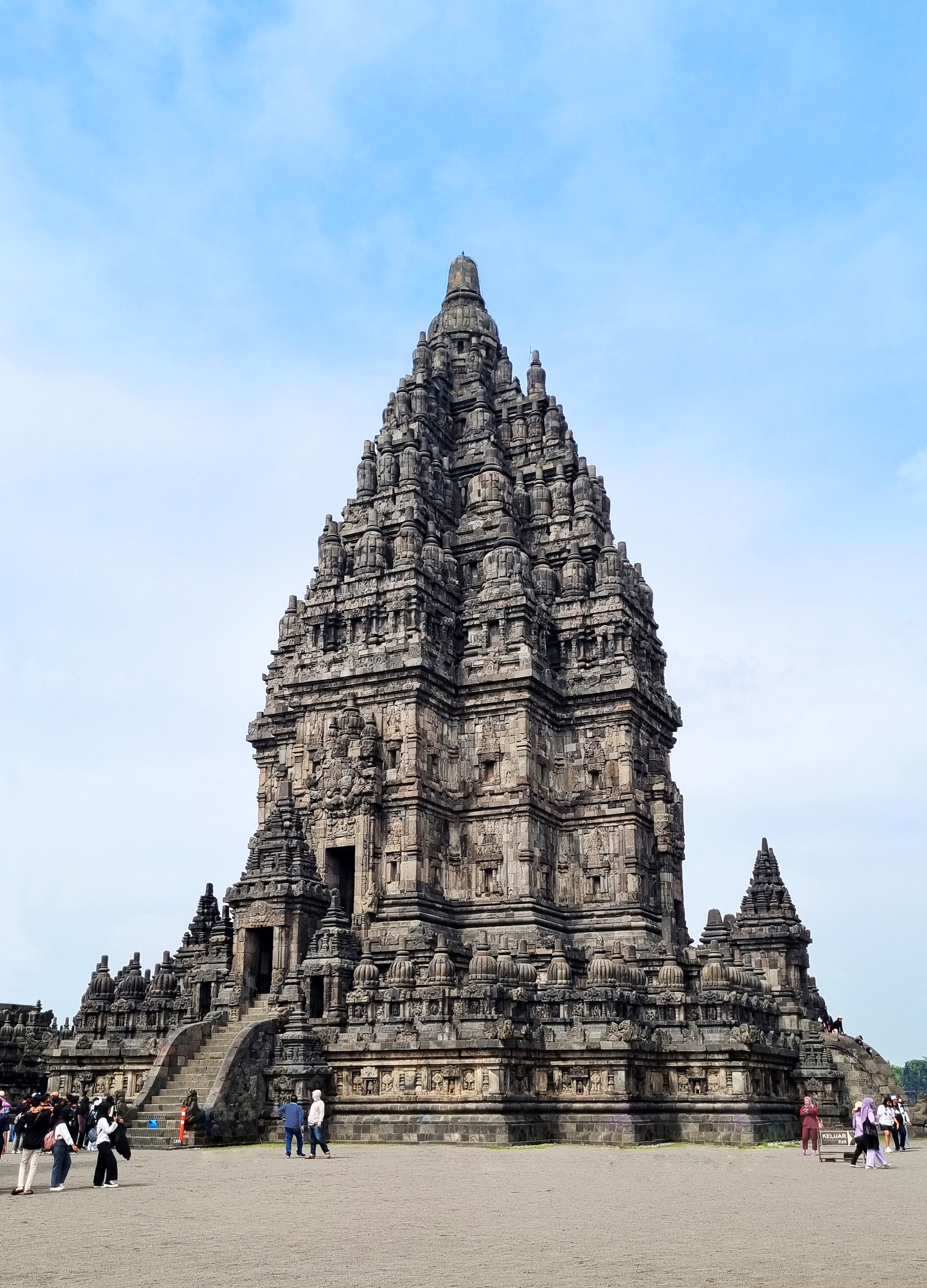
The 47 metres tall Shiva temple in Prambanan compound. The towering candi prasada (temple tower) are believed to represent the cosmic Mount Meru, the abode of gods.

Candi refers to a structure based on the Indian type of single-celled shrine, with a pyramidal tower above it, and a portico. The term Candi is given as a prefix to the many temple-mountains in Indonesia, built as a representation of the Cosmic Mount Meru, an epitome of the universe. However, the term is also applied to many non-religious structures dated from the same period, such as gapura (gates), petirtaan (pools) and some habitation complexes. Examples of non-temple candis are the Bajang Ratu and Wringin Lawang gates of Majapahit. The "Candi Tikus bathing pool" in Trowulan and Jalatunda in Mount Penanggungan slopes, as well as the remnants of non-religious habitations and urban structures such as Ratu Boko and some of Trowulan city ruins, are also considered candi.

In ancient Java, a temple was probably originally called prāsāda (Sanskrit: प्रासाद), as evidenced by the Manjusrigrha inscription (dated to 792 CE) that mentioned "Prasada Vajrasana Manjusrigrha" to refer to the Sewu temple. This term is akin to the Cambodian and Thai term prasat which refer to the towering structure of a temple.

== Etymology ==
"Between circa the 7th and 15th centuries, hundred of religious structures were constructed of brick and stone in Java, Sumatra and Bali. These are called candi. The term refers to other pre-Islamic structures including gateways and even bathing places, but its principal manifestation is the religious shrine."

— Soekmono, R. "Candi:Symbol of the Universe".

From a Hindu perspective, the term candi itself is believed to have been derived from Candika, one of the manifestations of the goddess Durga as the goddess of death. This suggests that in ancient Indonesia the candi had mortuary functions as well as connections with the afterlife. The association of the name candi, candika or durga with Hindu-Buddhist temples is unknown in India and other parts of Southeast Asia outside of Indonesia, such as Cambodia, Thailand, or Burma.

Another theory from the Buddhist perspective suggests that the term candi might be a localized form of the Pali word cedi (Sanskrit: caitya), which is related to the Thai word chedi, which refers to a stupa. It may also be related to the Bodhisattva Candī (also known as Cundī or Candā).

Historians suggest that the temples of ancient Java were also used to store the ashes of cremated deceased kings or royalty. This is in line with the Buddhist concept of stupas as structures to store Buddhist relics, including the ashes and remains of holy Buddhist priests, kings, or patrons of Buddhism. The statue of the god stored inside the garbhagriha (main chamber) of the temple is often modeled after the deceased king and is considered to be the deified person of the king portrayed as Vishnu or Shiva according to the concept of devaraja. For example, the statue of king Airlangga from Belahan temple in Pasuruan is portrayed as Vishnu riding Garuda.

== Architecture ==
Borobudur ground plan taking the form of a Mandala

The candi architecture follows the typical Hindu architecture traditions based on Vastu Shastra. The temple layout, especially in the Central Java period, incorporates mandala temple plan arrangements and the typical high towering spires of Hindu temples. The candi was designed to mimic Meru, the holy mountain that is the abode of gods. The whole temple is a model of Hindu universe, according to Hindu cosmology, and the layers of Loka.

=== Structural elements ===
The Shiva temple Candi Prambanan consists of three ascending realms, the temple's base (Bhurloka), body (Bhurvaloka) and roof (Svarloka).

The candi structure and layout contains a hierarchy of the zones, from the less holy to the holiest realms. The Indic tradition of Hindu-Buddhist architecture arranges elements in three parts. Subsequently, the design, plan and layout of the temple follows the rule of space allocation within three elements; commonly identified as foot (base), body (center), and head (roof). The three zones are arranged according to a sacred hierarchy. Each of these Hindu and Buddhist concepts have their own terms, but the concept's essentials are identical. Either the compound site plan (horizontally) or the temple structure (vertically) consists of three zones:

- Bhurloka (in Buddhism, Kāmadhātu), the lowest realm of common mortals; humans, animals and demons. Where humans are bound by their lust, desire and unholy way of life. The outer courtyard and the foot (base) of each temple symbolize the realm of bhurloka.
- Bhuvarloka (in Buddhism, Rupadhatu), the middle realm of holy people, rishis, ascetics, and lesser gods. People here begin to see the light of truth. The middle courtyard and the body of each temple symbolize the realm of bhuvarloka.
- Svarloka (in Buddhism, Arupadhatu), the highest and holiest realm of gods, also known as svargaloka. The inner courtyard and the rooves of each temple symbolize the realm of svarloka. The rooves of Hindu structures are usually crowned with ratna (Sanskrit: jewel) or vajra, or, in the eastern Java period, a cube structure. Stupa or dagoba cylindrical structures serve as the pinnacle of Buddhist temples.

=== Style ===
Soekmono, an Indonesian archaeologist, has classified the candi styles into two main groups: a central Java style, which predominantly date to before 1000 CE, and an eastern Java style, which date to after 1000 CE. He groups the temples of Sumatra and Bali into the eastern Java style.

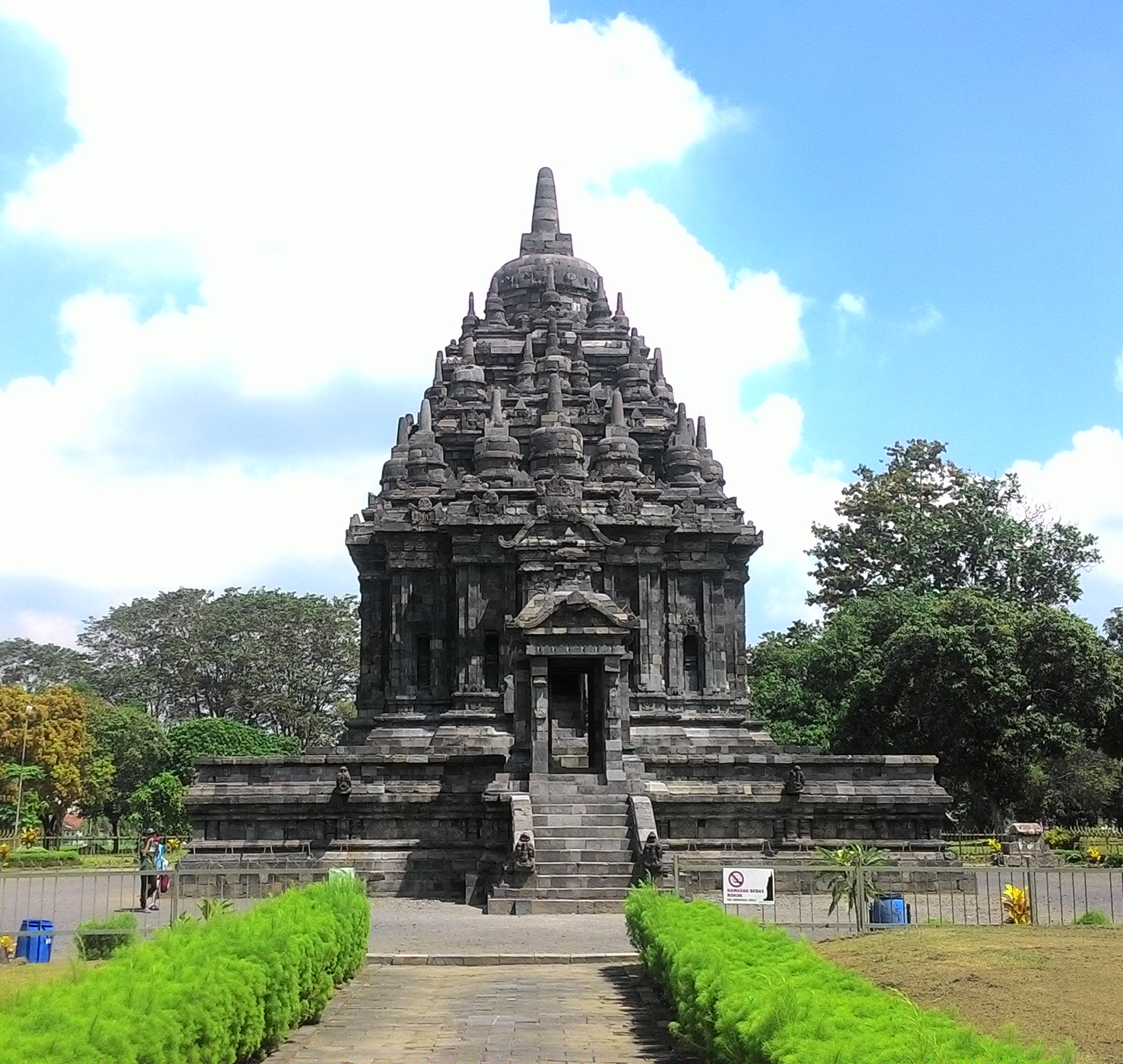
Central Java style
Bubrah temple

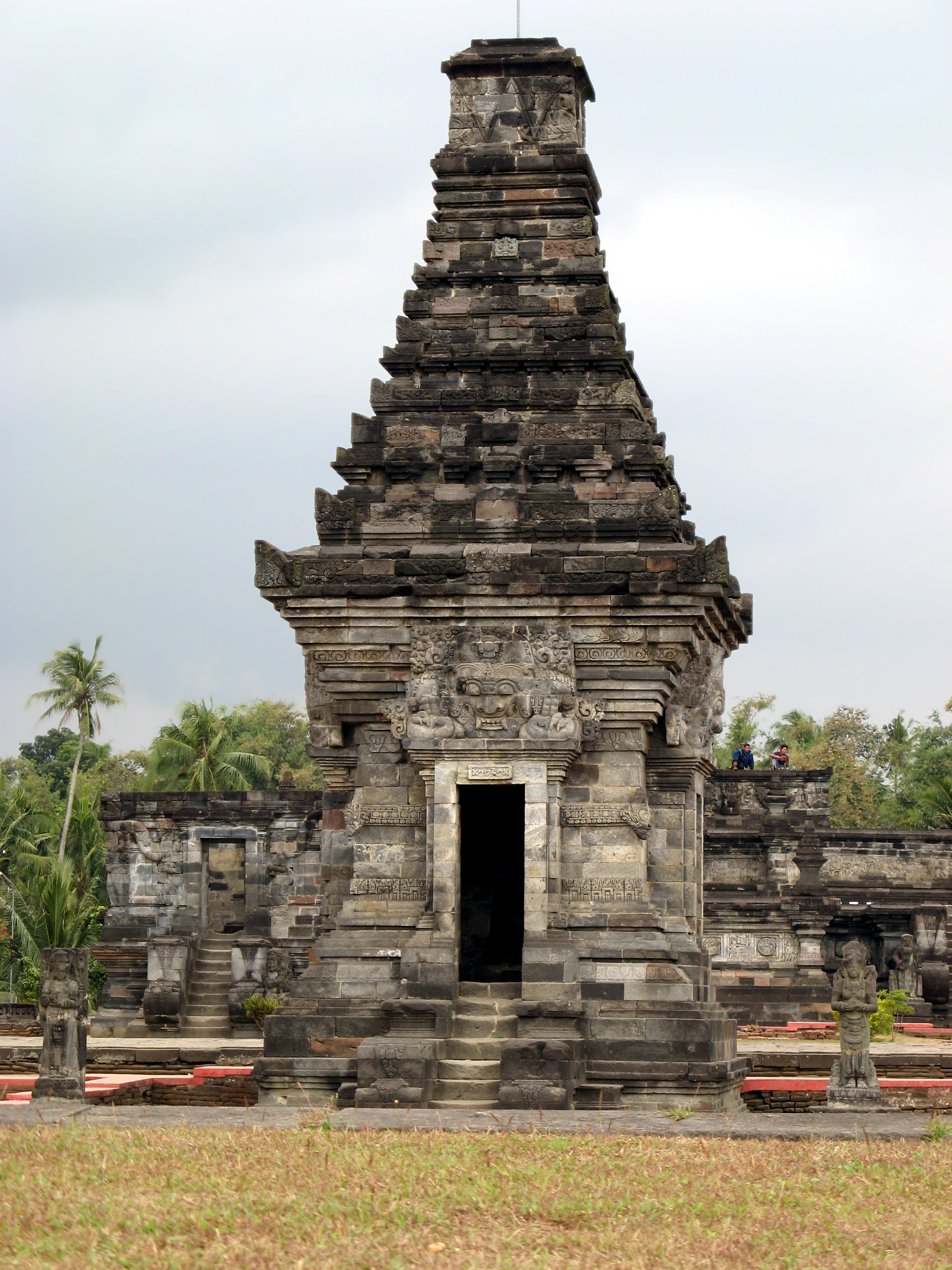
Eastern Java style
Penataran temple

Bubrah temple near Prambanan, an example of Central Javanese style, while Penataran temple in Blitar is an example of Eastern Javanese style

| Parts of the temple | Central Java style | Eastern Java style |
|---|---|---|
| Shape of the structure | Tends to be bulky | Tends to be slender and tall |
| Roof | Clearly stepped roof sections, usually consist of three parts | The multiple parts of the stepped sections form a smooth combined roof structure |
| Pinnacle | Stupa (Buddhist temples), Ratna or Vajra (Hindu temples) | Cube (mostly Hindu temples), sometimes Dagoba cylindrical structures (Buddhist temples) |
| Portal and niches adornment | Kala-Makara style; Kala head without lower jaw opening its mouth located on top of the portal, connected with double Makara on each side of the portal | Only Kala head sneering with the mouth complete with lower jaw located on top of the portal, Makara is absent |
| Relief | Projected rather high from the background, the images was done in naturalistic style | Projected rather flat from the background, the images was done in stylized style similar to Balinese wayang image |
| Layout and location of the main temple | Concentric mandala, symmetric, formal; with main temple located in the center of the complex surrounded by smaller perwara temples in regular rows | Linear, asymmetric, followed topography of the site; with main temple located in the back or furthermost from the entrance, often located in the highest ground of the complex, perwara temples is located in front of the main temple |
| Direction | Mostly faced east | Mostly faced west |
| Materials | Mostly andesite stone | Mostly red brick |

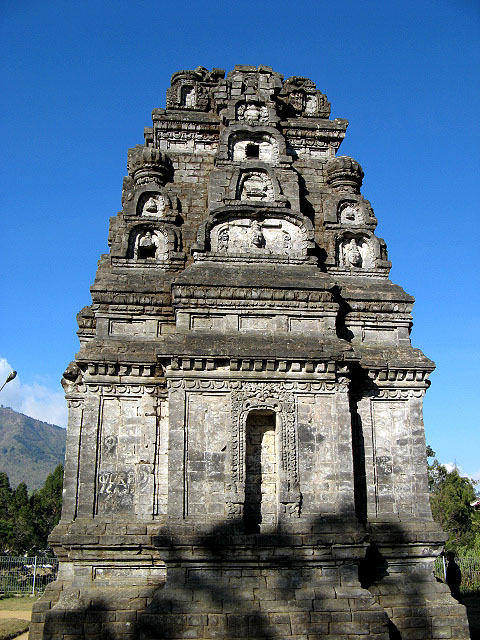
Bima temple, one of Dieng temples. It was one of the earliest temples in Java.

There are material, form, and location exceptions to these general design traits. While the Penataran, Jawi, Jago, Kidal and Singhasari temples, for example, belong to the eastern Java group, they use andesite stone similar to the Central Java temple material. Temple ruins in Trowulan, such as Brahu, Jabung and Pari temples use red brick. Similarly, the Prambanan temple is tall and slender similar to the east Java style, yet the roof design is Central Javan in style. The locations do not always correlate with the temple styles: for example Candi Badut is located in Malang, East Java, yet the period and style belongs to the older 8th century central Javanese style.

The earlier northern central Java complexes, such as the Dieng temples, are smaller and contain only temples which exhibit simpler carvings, whereas the later southern complexes, such as Sewu temple, are grander, with a richer elaboration of carving, and concentric layout of the temple complex.

The Majapahit period saw the revival of Austronesian megalithic design elements, such stepped pyramids (punden berundak). These design cues are seen in the Sukuh and Cetho temples in Mount Lawu in eastern Central Java, and in stepped sanctuary structures on the Mount Penanggungan slopes that are similar to meso-American stepped pyramids.

== Materials ==
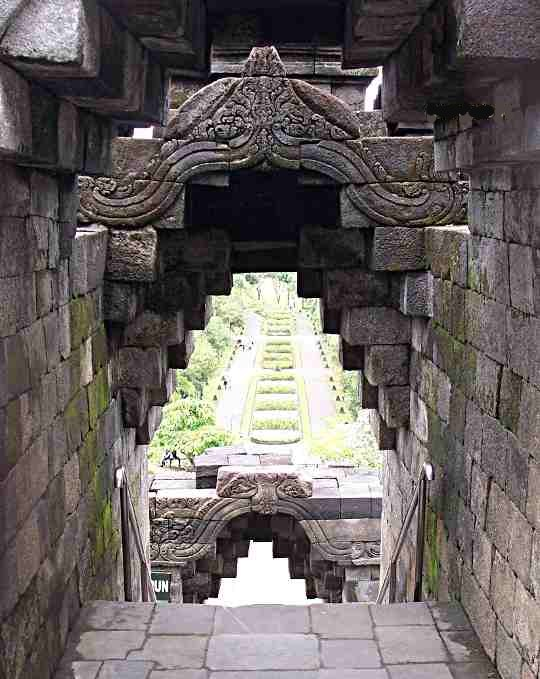
Interlocking andesite stone blocks forming a corbeling arch in Borobudur

Most of the well-preserved candi in Indonesia are made from andesite stone. Their longevity is due to the stone's durability, compared to bricks, against tropical weathers and torrential rains. Nevertheless, certain periods, especially the Majapahit era, saw the extensive use of red brick as temple and building materials. The following materials are commonly used in temple construction in Indonesia:

- Andesite is an extrusive igneous volcanic rock, of intermediate composition, with aphanitic to porphyritic texture. Its colour ranges from light to dark grey. Andesite is especially abundant in the volcanic island of Java and is mined from certain cliffs or stone quarries with andesite deposits formed from compressed ancient magma chambers or cooled down lava spills. Each andesite stone is custom made into blocks with interlocking technique, to construct temple walls, floors and building. Andesite stones are easily formed and carved with an iron chisel, making it a suitable material for temple walls and decorative carvings such as bas-reliefs. The Andesite walls were carved with exquisite narrative bas-reliefs, which can be observed in many temples, especially in Borobudur and Prambanan. Andesite rocks are also used as the material for carved statues, like the images of deities and Buddha.

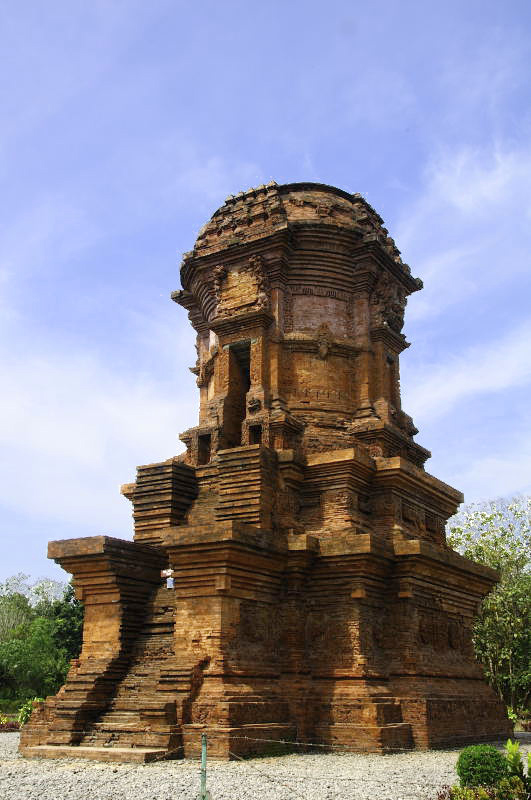
Red brick Jabung temple, dated from Majapahit period

- Brick is also used to construct temples. The oldest brick temple structure is the Batujaya temple compound in Karawang, West Java, dated to the 2nd to 12th century CE. Although brick had been used in the candi of Indonesia's classical age, it was Majapahit architects of the 14th and 15th centuries who mastered it. Making use of a vine sap and palm sugar mortar, their temples had a strong geometric quality. Examples of Majapahit temples include Brahu temple in Trowulan, Pari in Sidoarjo, and Jabung in Probolinggo. Some temples in Sumatra, such as Bahal temple, Muaro Jambi, and Muara Takus are made from bricks. However, compared to lava andesite stone, clay red bricks are less durable, especially if exposed to hot and humid tropical elements and torrential monsoon rain. As a result, many red brick structures have crumbled down over centuries, and reconstruction efforts require recasting and replacing the damaged structure with new bricks.
- Tuff is a volcanic rock that is quite abundant near Javanese volcanoes or limestone formations. In Indonesian and Javanese languages, tuff is called batu putih (white stone), which reflects its light color. The characteristic chalkiness of this stone, however, has made it unsuitable to being carved into bas-reliefs for building ornaments. Compared to andesite, tuff is considered an inferior quality building material. In Javanese temples, tuff is usually used for stone fillings—forming the inner structure of the temple—while the outer layer employs andesite that is more suitable to be carved. Tuff quarries can be found in Sewu limestone ranges near Ratu Boko hill. Tuff fillings in a temple can be seen in Ratu Boko crematorium temple. Tuff was sometimes used as the building material for the outer walls of temple compounds, such as the walls found buried around Sewu and Sambisari temples.
- Stucco is a material similar to modern concrete, made from a mixture of sand, stone, water, and sometimes ground clamshell. Stucco as a temple building material is observable in the Batujaya temple compound in West Java.

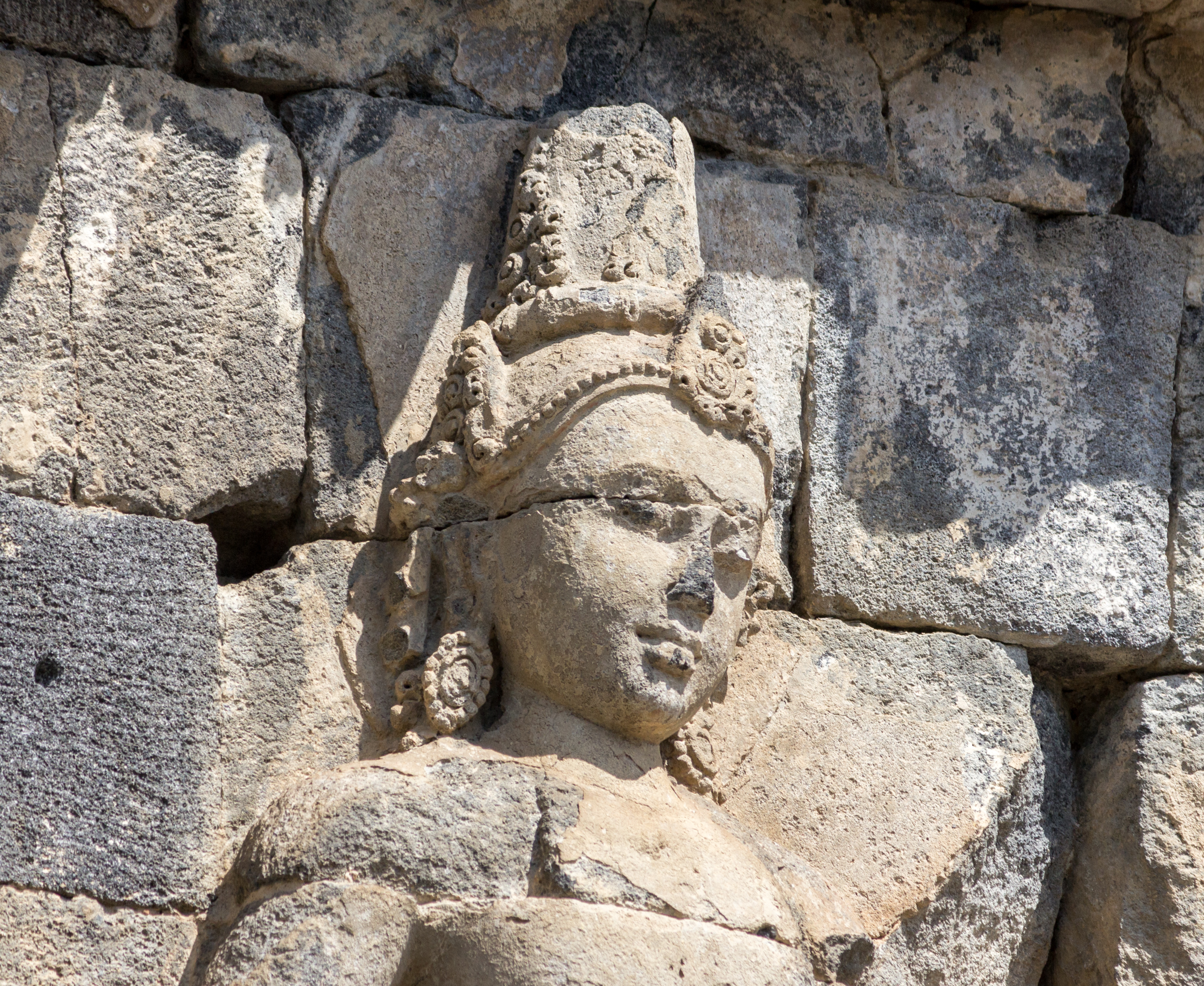
Traces of worn off vajralepa plaster on Sari's relief

- Plaster, also called vajralepa (Sanskrit: diamond plaster), is used to coat the temple walls. The white-yellowish plaster is made from the mixture of ground limestone, tuff or white earth (kaolin), with plant substances such as gums or resins as binder. The varjalepa white plaster was applied onto the andesite walls, and then painted with bright colors, serving perhaps as a beacon of Buddhist teaching. The traces of worn-off vajralepa plaster can be observed in Borobudur, Sari, Kalasan and Sewu temple walls.
- Wood is believed to be used in some candi constructions or at least as temple building materials. Sari and Plaosan temples, for example, are known to have traces of stone indentions that would support wooden beams and floors on its second floor, as well as traces of wooden stairs. Ratu Boko compound has building bases and stone umpak column bases, which suggests that the wooden capitals once stood there to support a wooden roof structure made of organic materials. Traces of holes to install wooden window railings and wooden doors are observable in many of the perwara (complementary smaller) temples. Of course, wooden materials easily decay in a humid tropical climate, leaving no traces after centuries.

== Motifs and decorations ==
=== Kala-Makara ===
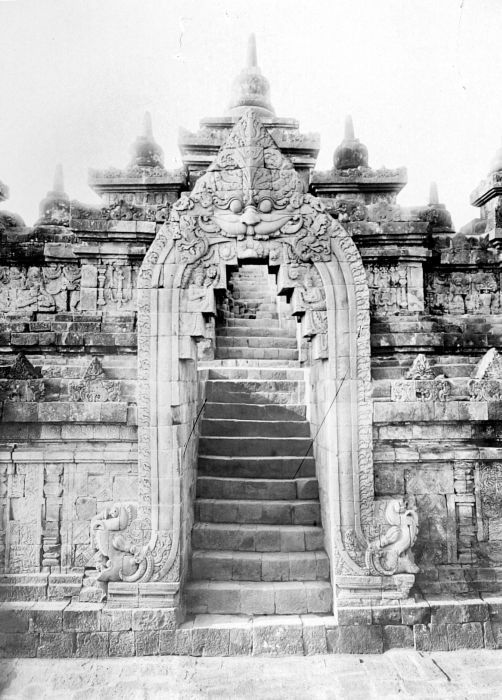
Kala-makara on the portal of Borobudur gates, Kala's head on top of the portal and makaras flanking either sides

The candis of ancient Java are known for the application of kala-makara as both decorative and symbolic elements of the temple architecture. Kala is the giant symbolizing time - making Kala's head a temple portal's element symbolizes that time consumes everything. Kala is also a protective figure, with a fierce giant face that scares away malevolent spirits. Makara is a mythical sea monster, the vahana of sea-god Varuna. It has been depicted typically as half mammal and half fish. In many temples, it is depicted in the form of half fish or seal, with the head of an elephant. It is also shown with the head and jaws of a crocodile, an elephant trunk, the tusks and ears of a wild boar, the darting eyes of a monkey, the scales and the flexible body of a fish, and the swirling tailing feathers of a peacock. Both kala and makara are applied as protective figures of the temple's entrance.

Kala, the giant head, often resides on top of the entrance with makaras projected on either side of kala's head, flanking the portal or projected on the top corner as antefixes. The kala-makara theme also can be found on stair railings. On the upper part of stairs, the mouth of kala's head projects makara downward. The intricate stone carving of twin makaras flank the lower level of stairs, with its curved bodies forming the stair's railings. Other than makaras, kala's head might also project its tongue as stair's railings. These types of stair-decorations can be observed in Borobudur and Prambanan. Makara's trunks are often describes as having gold ornaments or spouting jewels, while in its mouth are depicted Gana dwarf figures or animals such as lions or parrots.

=== Linga-Yoni ===
Central Javanese linga-yoni with spout decorated and supported by nāga serpent, Yogyakarta 9th century

In ancient Javanese candi, linga-yoni symbolism was only found in Hindu temples, specifically those of Shivaist faith. Therefore, they are absent in Buddhist temples. The linga is a phallic post or cylinder, symbolic of the god Shiva and of creative power. Some lingas are segmented into three parts: a square base symbolic of Brahma, an octagonal middle section symbolic of Vishnu, and a round tip symbolic of Shiva. The lingas that survive from the Javanese classical period are generally made of polished stone in this shape.

Lingas are implanted on a flat square base with a hole in it, called a yoni, symbolic of the womb and representing Parvati, Shiva's consort. A yoni usually has a kind of spout, usually decorated with nāga, to help channel and collect the liquids poured upon linga-yoni during Hindu ritual. As a religious symbol, the function of the linga is primarily that of worship and ritual. The oldest remains of linga-yoni can be found in Dieng temples from the earlier period, circa 7th century. Originally, each temple might have a complete pair of linga-yoni unity. However, most of the times, the linga is missing.

In the tradition of Javanese kingship, certain lingas were erected as symbols of the king himself or his dynasty, and were housed in royal temples in order to express the king's consubstantiality with Shiva. For example, the linga-yoni of Gunung Wukir temple, according to Canggal inscription, was connected to King Sanjaya of the Mataram kingdom, in 654 Saka (732 CE). Other temples that contain complete linga-yoni include Sambisari and Ijo temples. Eastern Javanese temples that contain linga-yoni are Panataran and Jawi temple, although the linga is missing.

=== Bas-reliefs ===
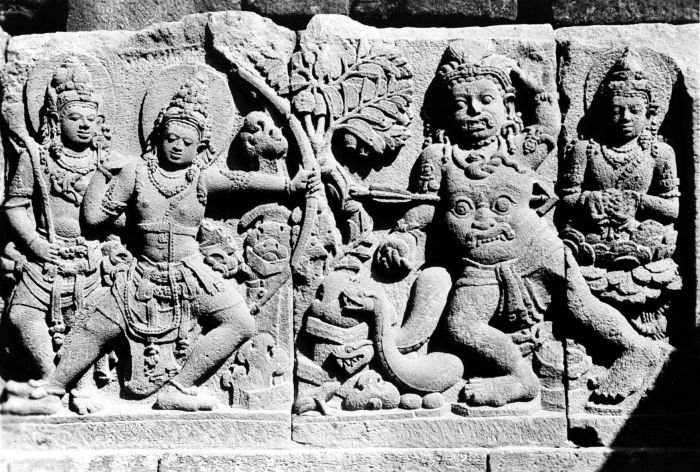
Rama killing evil giant, bas-relief of Ramayana on Prambanan temple, Central Java style

The walls of candi often display bas-reliefs, which both serve as decorative elements and convey religious symbolic meanings through narrative bas-reliefs. The most exquisite of the temple bas-reliefs can be found in Borobudur and Prambanan temples. The first four terrace of Borobudur walls are showcases of bas-relief sculptures. These are considered to be the most elegant and graceful in the ancient Buddhist world. The Buddhist scriptures describe by bas-reliefs in Borobudur include Karmavibhangga (the law of karma), Lalitavistara (the birth of Buddha), Jataka, Avadana and Gandavyuha. Meanwhile in Prambanan, Hindu scriptures are described in its bas-relief panels, such as the Ramayana and Bhagavata Purana (popularly known as Krishnayana).

The bas-reliefs in Borobudur also depict many scenes of daily life in 8th-century ancient Java, from courtly palace life, to that of a hermit in the forest, to those of commoners in the village. It also depicts temples, marketplaces, various flora and fauna, and native vernacular architecture. People depicted here include images of the king, queen, princes, noblemen, courtiers, soldiers, servants, commoners, priests and hermits. The reliefs also depict mythical spiritual beings in Buddhist beliefs, such as asuras, gods, boddhisattvas, kinnaras, gandharvas and apsaras. The images often served as reference for historians researching certain subjects, such as the study of architecture, weaponry, economy, fashion, and modes of transportation of 8th-century Maritime Southeast Asia. One famous rendering of an 8th-century Southeast Asian double outrigger ship is the Borobudur Ship.

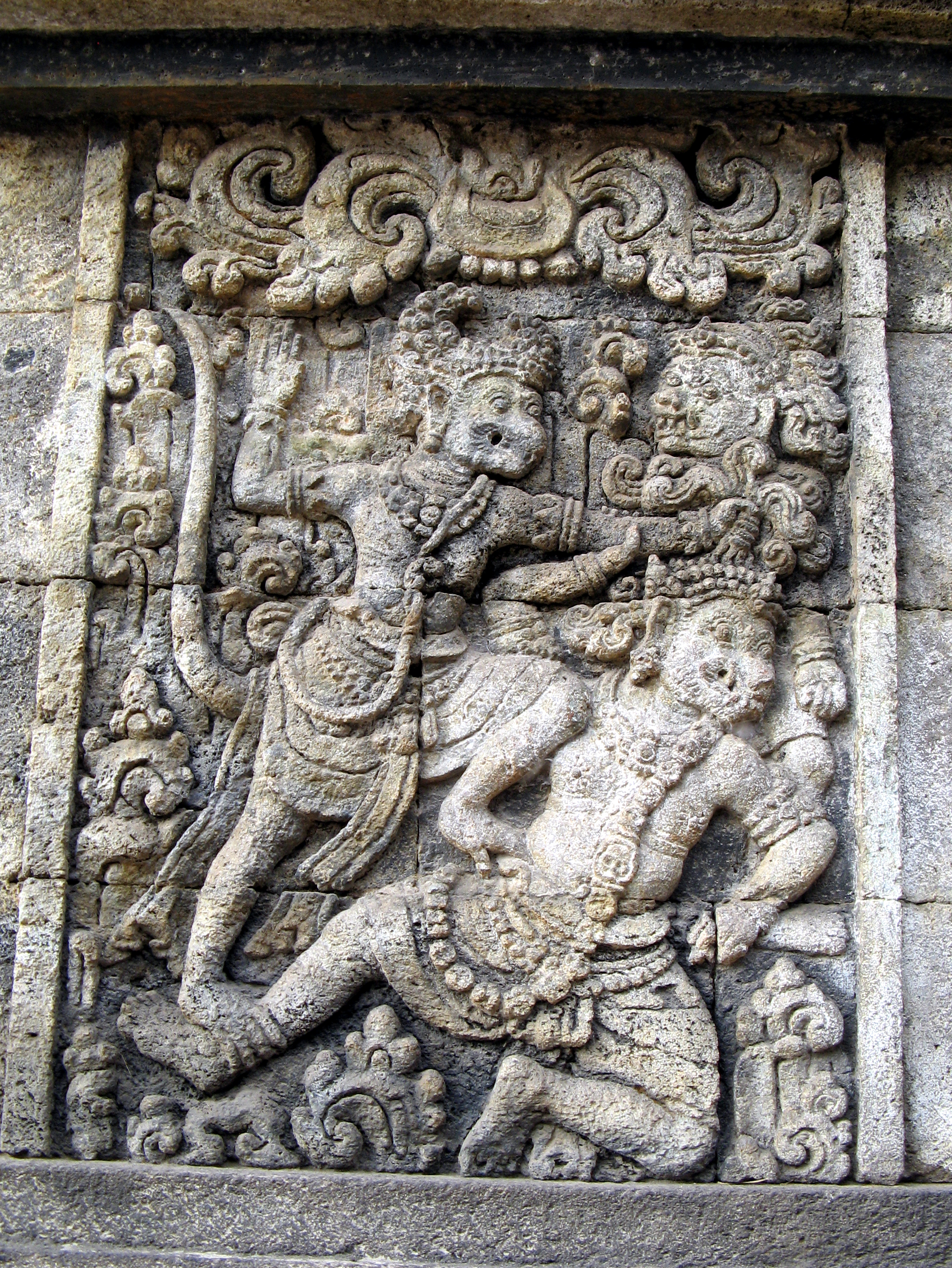
Hanuman battling enemy, bas-relief of Ramayana on Penataran temple, East Java style

There are significant distinction in the bas-reliefs' style and aesthetics between the Central Javanese period (prior of 1000 CE) and East Javanese period (after 1000 CE). The earlier Central Javanese style, as observable in Borobudur and Prambanan, is more exquisite and naturalistic in style. The reliefs are projected rather high from the background and the images done in a naturalistic style with proper ideal body proportion. On the other hand, the bas-reliefs of Eastern Javanese style are projected rather flat from the background, the images done in stiffer poses and more stylized, similar to currently Balinese wayang images. The East Javanese style is currently preserved in Balinese art, style and aesthetics in temple bas-reliefs, wayang shadow puppet imagery, and the Kamasan painting.

=== Deities ===
==== Kalpataru and Kinnaras ====
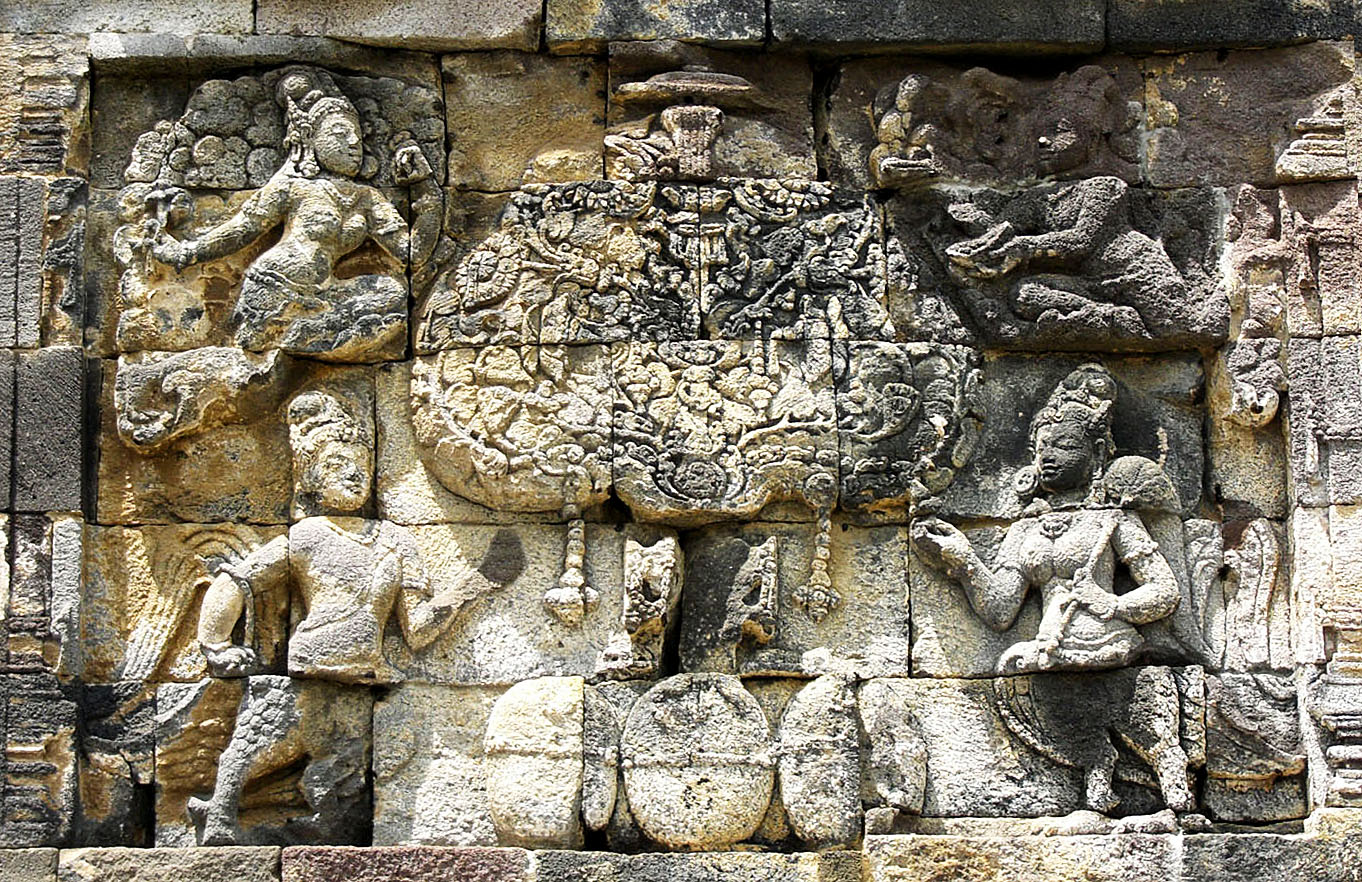
Kinnara (male), Kinnari (female), Apsara, and Devata guarding Kalpataru, the divine tree of life. 8th century Pawon temple, Java, Indonesia

The images of coupled Kinnara and Kinnari can be found in Borobudur, Mendut, Pawon, Sewu, Sari, and Prambanan temples. Usually, they are depicted as birds with human heads, or humans with the lower limbs of birds. The pair of Kinnara and Kinnari are usually depicted guarding Kalpataru (Kalpavriksha), the tree of life, and sometimes guarding a jar of treasure. There are bas-relief in Borobudur depicting the story of the famous kinnari, Manohara.

The lower outer walls of Prambanan temples were adorned with rows of small niche containing images of simha (lion) flanked by two panels depicting bountiful kalpataru (kalpavriksha) trees. These wish-fulfilling sacred trees, according to Hindu-Buddhist beliefs, are flanked on either side by kinnaras or animals, such as pairs of birds, deer, sheep, monkeys, horses, elephants etc. The pattern of a lion in the niche, flanked by kalpataru trees, is typical of a Prambanan temple compound, and is thud called a "Prambanan panel".

==== Bodhisattva and Tara ====
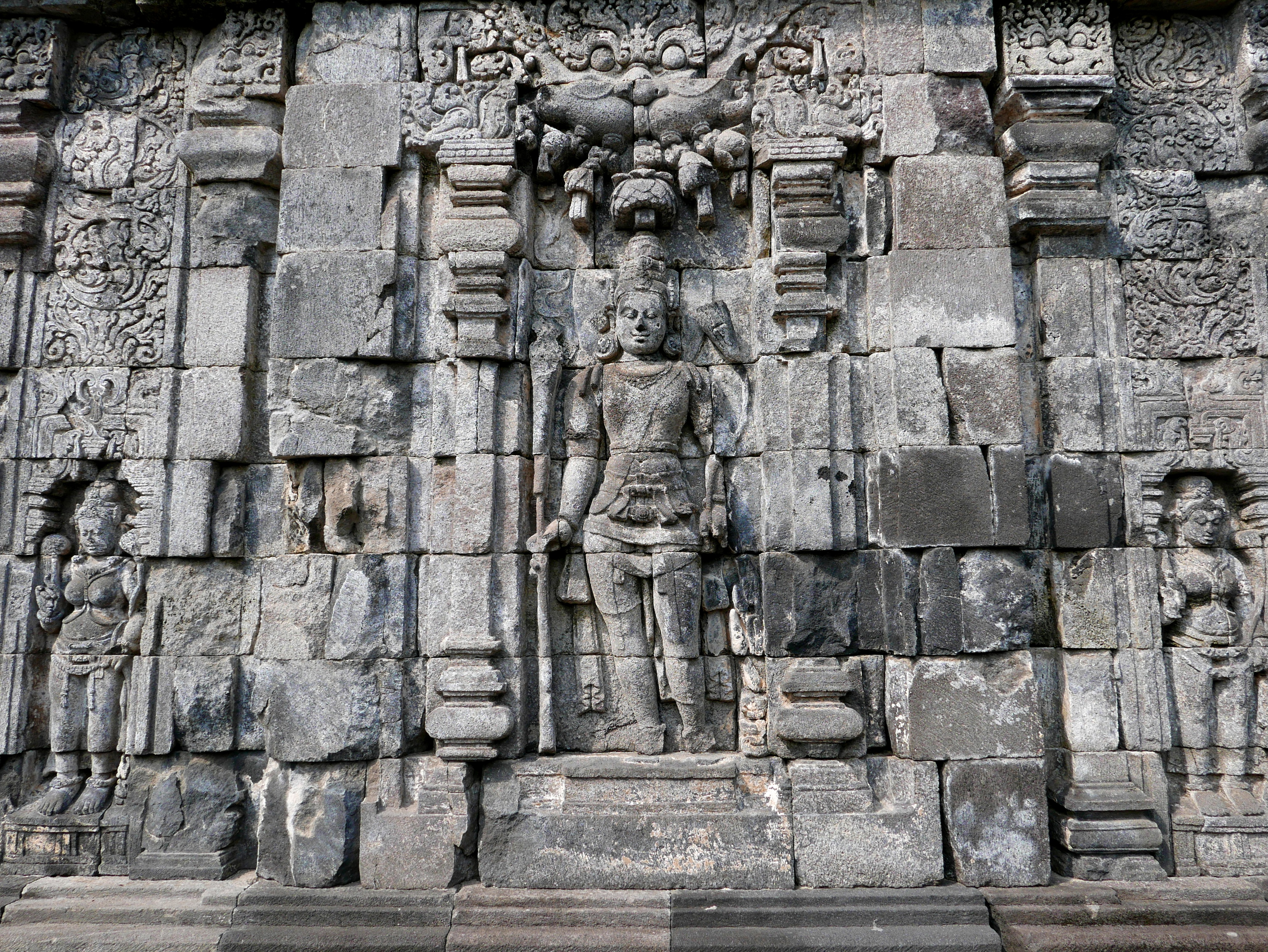
A Bodhisattva flanked by two Taras in Sewu temple

In Buddhist temples, the panels of bas-reliefs are usually adorned with exquisite images of the male figures of Bodhisattvas and female figures of Taras, along with Gandharvas (heavenly musicians) and sometimes a flock of Gana dwarfs. These are deities and divinities in Buddhist beliefs, which reside in the Tushita heaven in Buddhism cosmology.

Bodhisattvas are usually depicted as handsome men with peaceful and serene facial expressions, adorned with luxurious jewelry akin to a king or a deity. Taras are his female counterparts, figures of beautiful celestial maidens. Both figures are depicted gracefully, usually holding various kinds of lotus (red padma, blue utpala, or white kumuda), monk staffs (khakkhara) or fly whisks (chamara), and standing in tribhanga pose. Notable images of bodhisattvas can be found adorning the outer walls of Plaosan, Sari, Kalasan, Sewu, Pawon and Borobudur temple.

==== Devata and Apsara ====
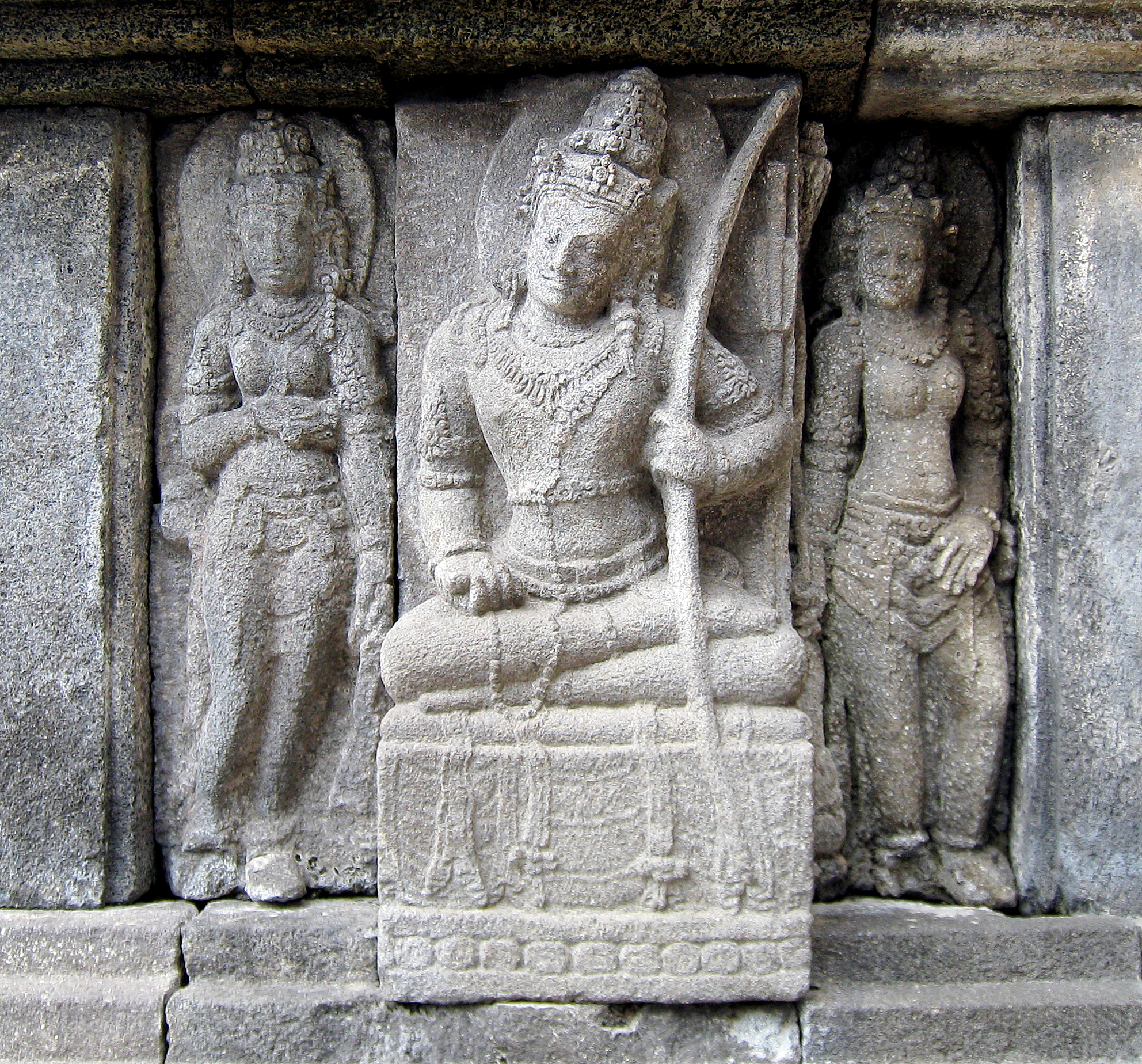
A Devata flanked by two apsaras in Prambanan temple

In Hindu temples, the celestial couple, male Devatas and female Apsaras, are usually found adorning the panels of temple walls. They are the Hindu counterpart to the Buddhist Bodhisattva-Tara celestial beings. On the other side of the narrative panels in Prambanan, the temple wall are adorned with statues and reliefs of devatas and brahmin sages. The figures of lokapalas, the celestial guardians of directions, can be found in Shiva temples. The Brahmin sage editors of veda are carved on Brahma temple walls, while in Vishnu temples, the figures of male devatas are flanked by two apsaras. The depiction of celestial beings of lesser gods and goddesses represents the Hindu concept of the sacred realm of Svargaloka. This corresponds to the concept of the towering Hindu temple as the epitome of Mount Meru in Hindu cosmology.

=== Guardians ===
==== Dvarapala ====
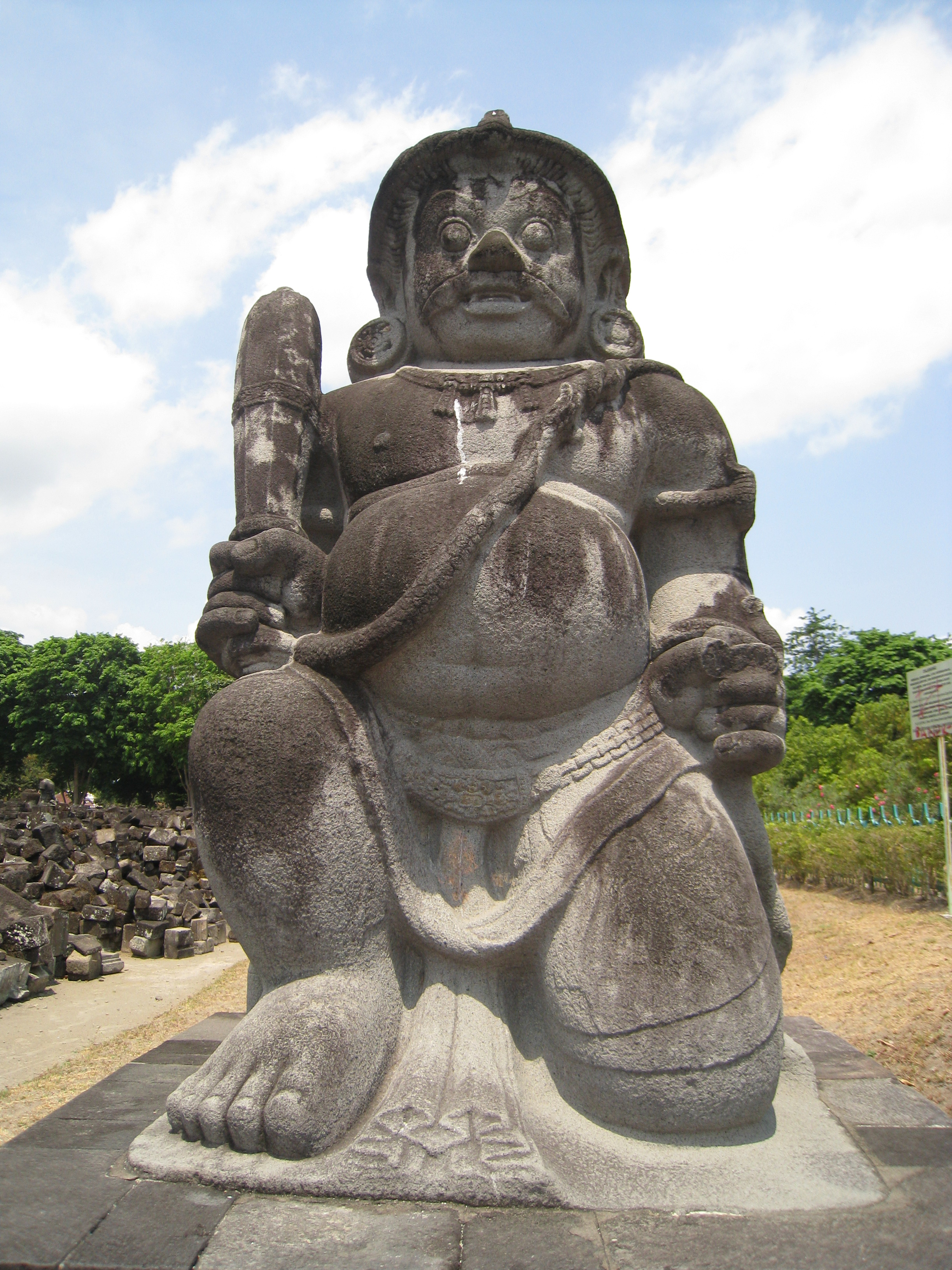
One of dvarapala statues guarding Sewu temple

Most larger temple compounds in ancient Java were guarded by a pair of dvarapala statues, as gate guardians. The twin giants are usually placed flanking the entrance in front of the temple, or in the four cardinal directions. Dvarapalas take the form of two fierce giants or demons that ward off evil and malevolent spirits from entering the sacred temple compounds. In Central Javanese art, dvarapala is mostly portrayed as a stout and rather chubby giant, with a fierce face, glaring round goggle eyes, protruding fangs, curly hair and moustach, and a fat and round belly. The giant is usually depicted as holding gada and sometimes has knives as weapons.

In East Javanese art and Balinese versions, the dvarapala is usually depicted as rather well-built and muscular, with a fine example seen at the Adan-adan site near Kediri. The exception is a gigantic dvarapala of Singhasari near Malang, East Java, that measures 3.7 metres (12 ft) tall. The most notable dvarapala statues are those of candi Sewu, each pair guarding four cardinal directions of the grand temple complex, making a total eight large dvarapala statues in perfect condition. The dvarapalas of Sewu temple have become the prototype of Gupolo guardians in later Javanese art, copied as guardians in Javanese keratons of Yogyakarta and Surakarta. Another fine example is the two pairs of dvarapala guarding the twin temples of Plaosan.

==== Lions ====
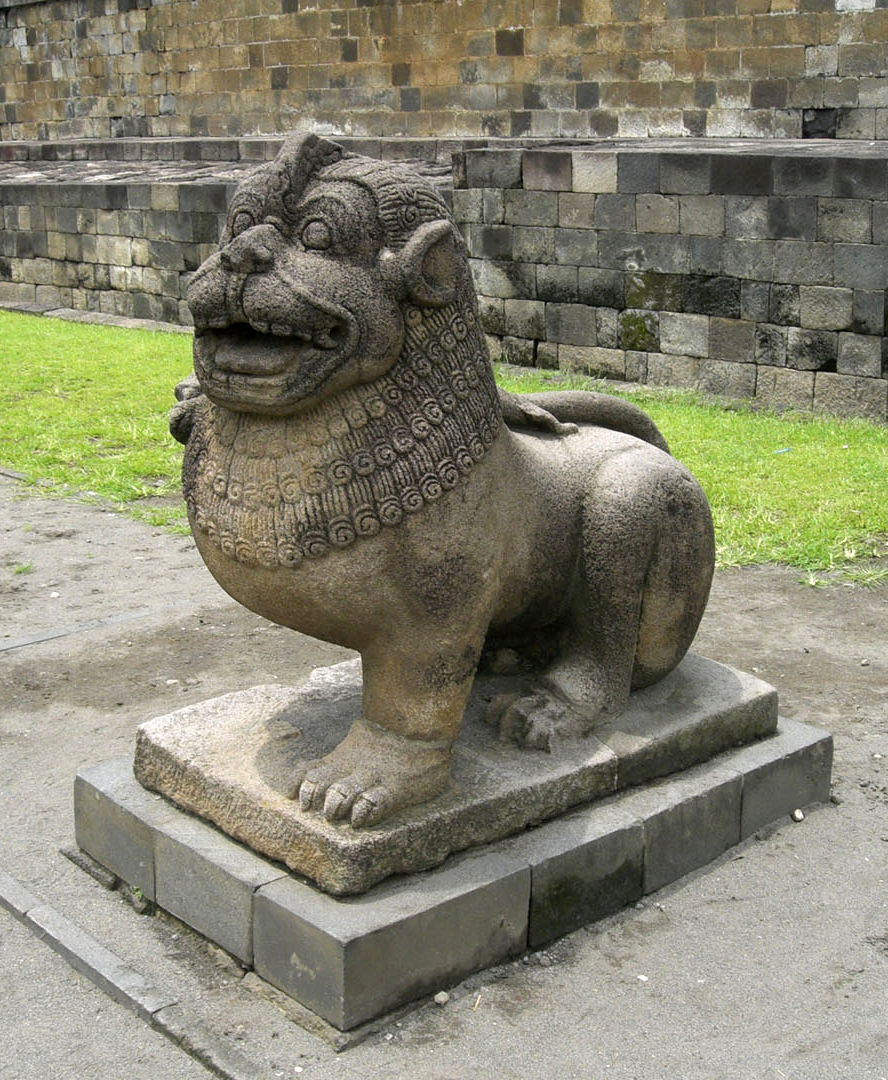
Lion guardian of Borobudur

Pairs of lions (Sanskrit: Siṁha, Indonesian and Javanese: Singa) statues flanking the portal are often placed as the guardians of a candi entrance. Lions were never native to Southeast Asia according to recorded history. As the result, the depiction of lions in ancient Southeast Asian art, especially in ancient Java and Cambodia, is far from the naturalistic style depicted in Greek or Persian art counterparts, since the depictions were all based on perception and imagination. The cultural depictions and the reverence of lions as the noble and powerful beasts in Southeast Asia was influenced by Indian culture, especially through Buddhist symbolism.

Pairs of lion statues are often found in temples in Southeast Asia as the gate guardians. At Borobudur Buddhist monument in Central Java, Indonesia, andesite stone statues of lions guard the four main entrances of Borobudur. The thrones of Buddha and Boddhisattva found in Kalasan and Mendut Buddhist temples of ancient Java depict elephants, lions, and makara. A statue of a winged lion was also found in Penataran temple in East Java.

=== Stupa, Ratna and Vajra pinnacles ===
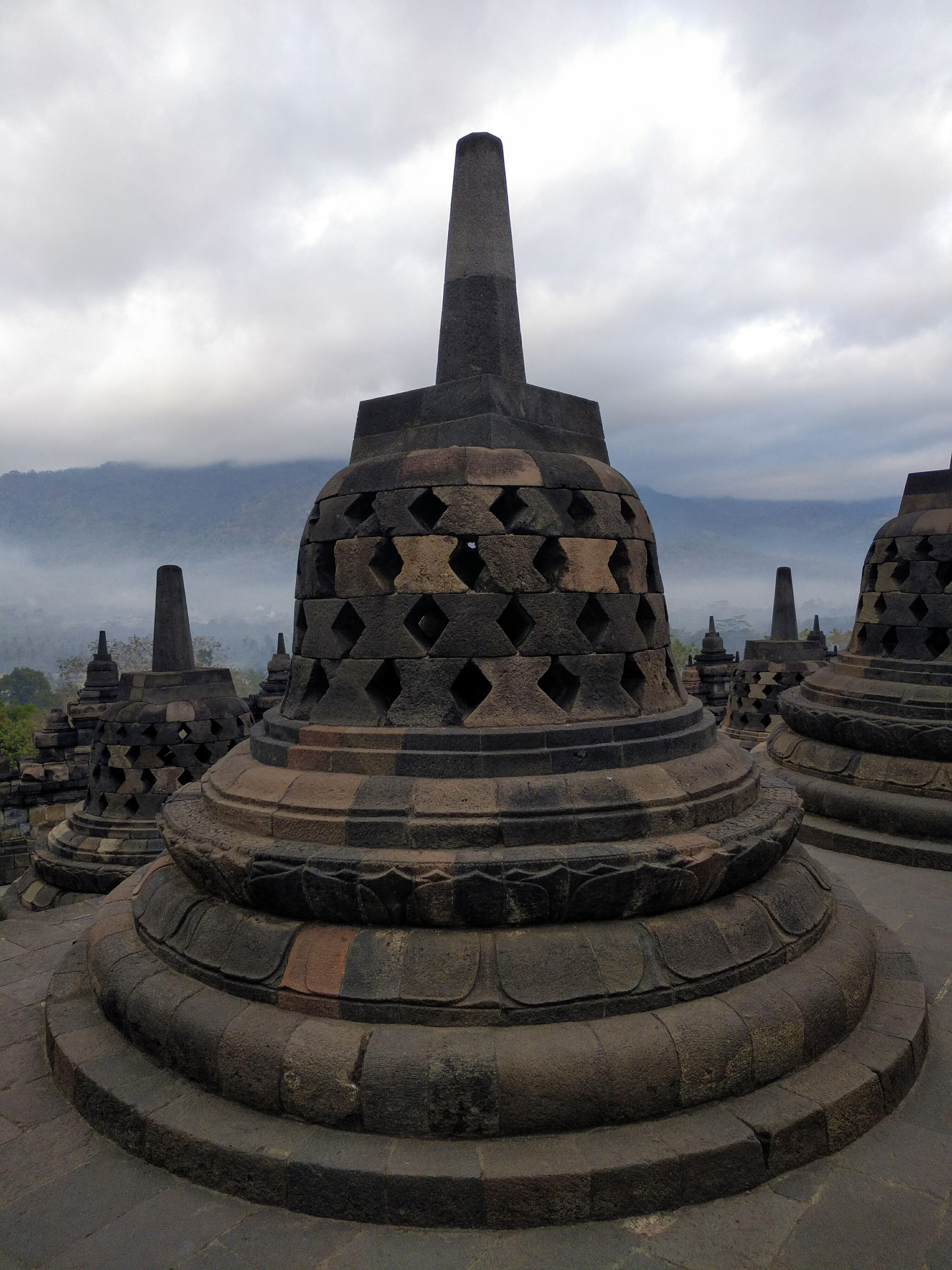
Bell-shaped perforated stupas of Borobudur

The religions associated with the temples of ancient Java can be easily distinguished from its pinnacles on top of the roof. Bell-shaped stupa can be found on the Buddhist temples' roof, while ratna, the symbolical pinnacle ornamental gem, are mostly found on Hindu temples.

The typical stupas in Javanese classical temple architecture are best described as those of Borobudur style; the bell-shaped stupa. The stupa in the Borobudur upper round terrace of Arupadhatu consists of a round lotus pedestal (padmasana or "lotus pad") and gently sloped bell-shaped dome (anda), with a rectangular or octagonal shape (harmika) sitting on top of the dome and serving as the base of the hexagonal rod-like pinnacle (yasti).

Each stupa is pierced by numerous decorative openings in rectangular or rhombus shapes. Statues of the Buddha sit inside the pierced stupa enclosures. Borobudur was first thought more likely to have served as a stupa, instead of a temple. A stupa is intended as a shrine for the Buddha. Sometimes stupas were built only as devotional symbols of Buddhism. A temple, on the other hand, is used as a house of worship.

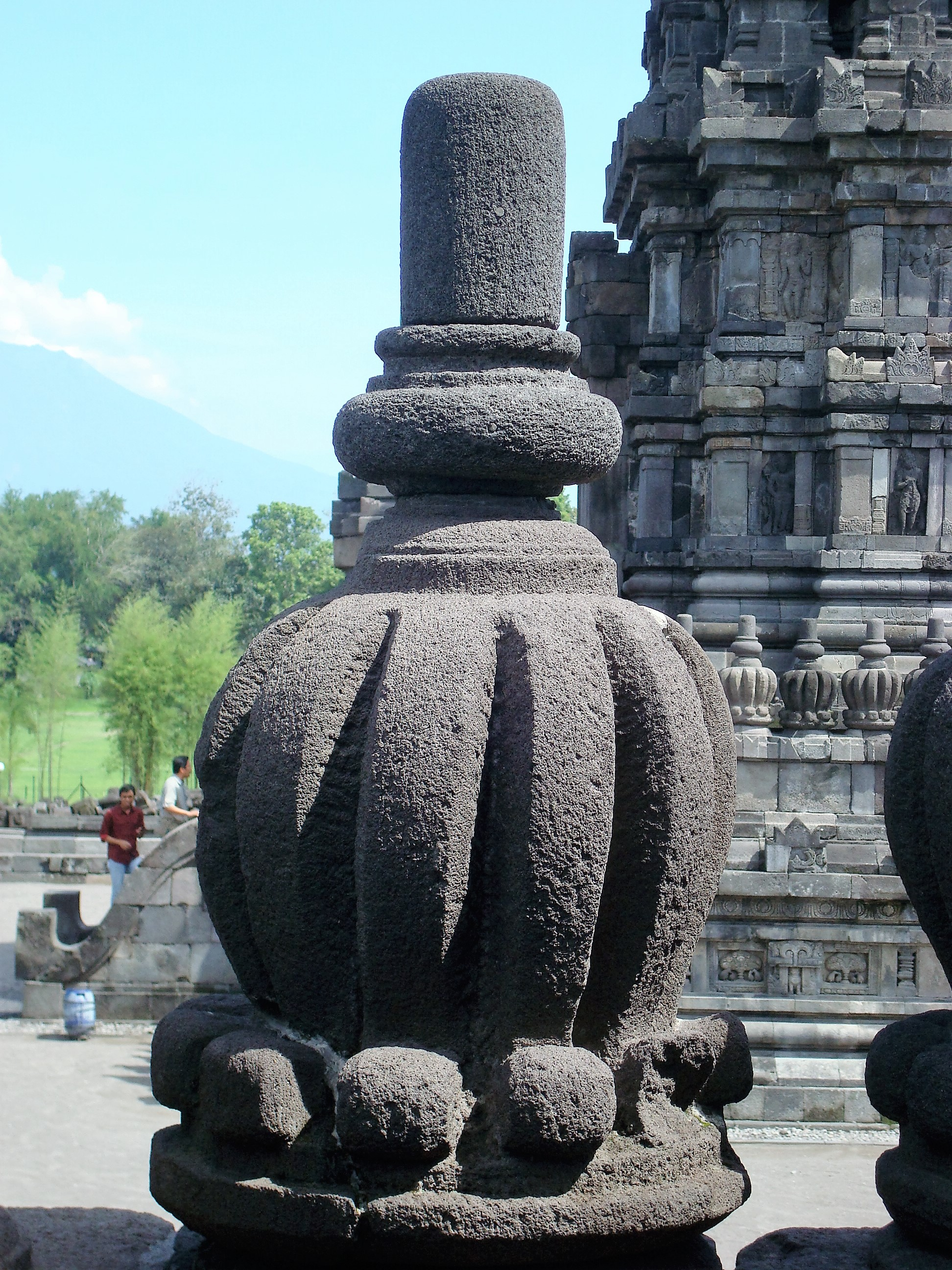
Prambanan vajra pinnacle

A typical Ratna pinnacle has a curved obtuse pyramidal shape, or sometimes cylindrical, composed of several base structures or pedestals decorated with ornamental seams (Javanese: pelipit). This form is known as a keben pinnacle and is modeled after the fruit of Barringtonia asiatica. It can be found as the pinnacle of both Hindu and Buddhist temples but is most prevalent in Hindu temples. Prominent examples of temples with ratna pinnacles are Sambisari and Ijo temple.

In Prambanan, stylized vajra replaced ratna as the temple's pinnacles. In ancient Javanese temple architecture, the vajra pinnacle probably served as the Hindu counterpart of the Buddhist stupa pinnacle. This practice is preserved in Balinese Hindu temples of later periods where the multi-tiered meru towers are crowned with vajra pinnacles. Nevertheless, vajra is a familiar symbol in both dharmic faiths. In later periods of Eastern Java temple architecture, the false lingga-yoni, or cube, can be found in Hindu temple's roof, while cylindrical dagoba can be found on top of Buddhist counterparts.

== Locations ==
Map showing the location of the main sites of the so-called "Indonesian classical period" or Hindu-Buddhist period. Black dots represent Hindu sites and red dots Buddhist sites.

The concentration of candi is especially dense in the Sleman Regency in Yogyakarta, as well as Magelang and Klaten in Central Java, which corresponds to the historical region of Kedu Plain (Progo River valley, Temanggung-Magelang-Muntilan area) and Kewu Plain (Opak River valley, around Prambanan), the cradle of Javanese civilization. Other important sites with notable temple compounds include Malang, Blitar and Trowulan areas in East Java. West Java also contains a small number of temples such as Batujaya and Cangkuang. Outside of Java, the candi type of temple can be found in Bali, Sumatra, and Southern Kalimantan, although they are quite scarce. In Sumatra, two exceptional sites are notable for their temple density: the Muaro Jambi Temple Compounds in Jambi and Padang Lawas or Bahal complex in North Sumatra.

The candis might be built on plain or uneven terrain. Prambanan and Sewu temples, for example, are built on flat, low-lying terrain, while the temples of Gedong Songo and Ijo are built on hill terraces on higher grounds or mountain slopes. Borobudur, on the other hand, is built upon a bedrock hill. The position, orientation and spatial organization of the temples within the landscape, and also their architectural designs, were determined by socio-cultural, religious and economic factors of the people, polity or the civilization that built and supported them.

=== Java ===
==== West Java ====
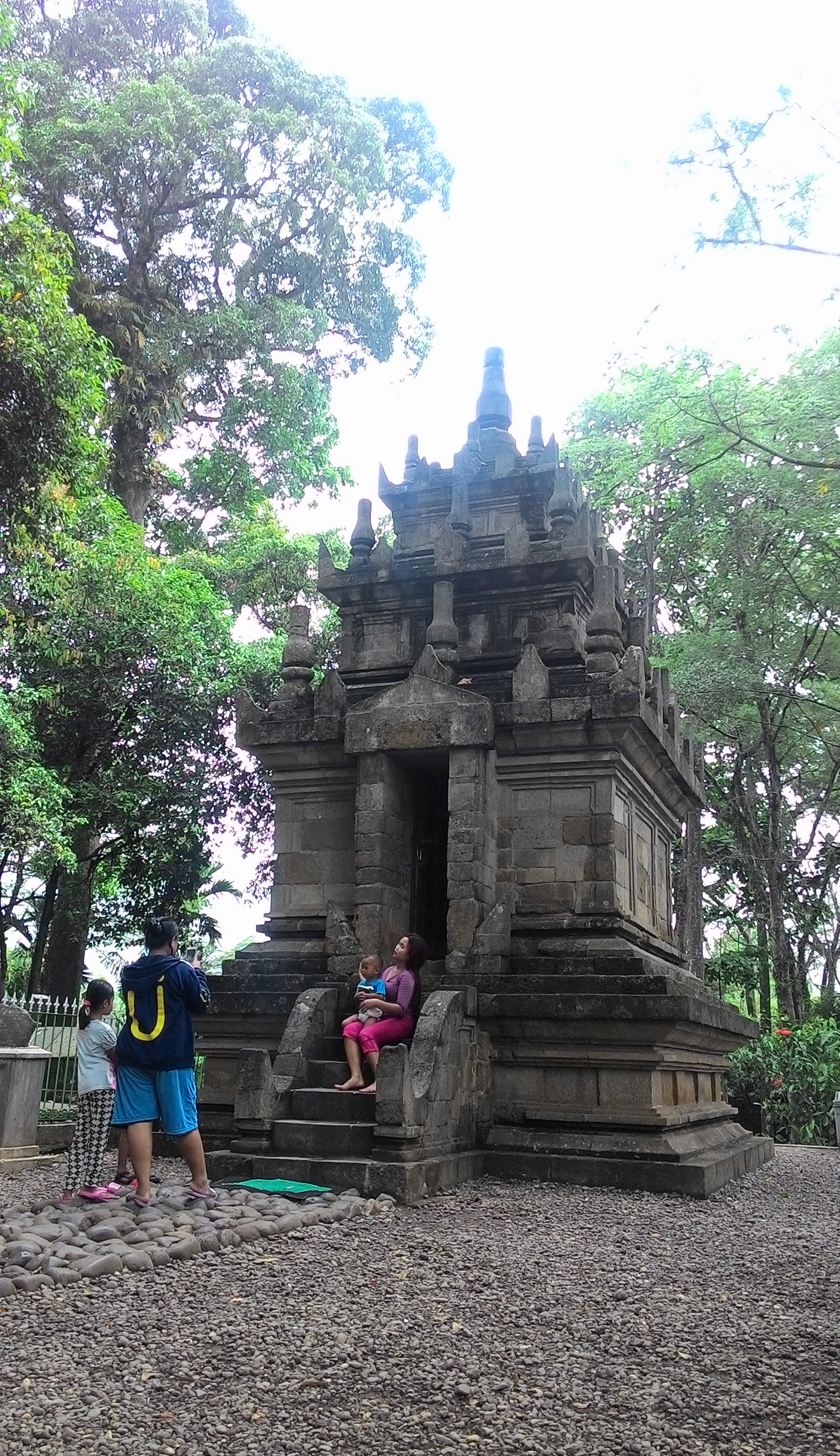
Cangkuang, Garut West Java

- Batujaya, a compound of Buddhist Stupa made from red brick and mortar located at Batu Jaya, Karawang, West Java. Probably linked with the Tarumanagara kingdom of the 6th century AD.
- Cibuaya, a compound of Vishnuite Hindu temples made from red brick and mortar, also located at Batu Jaya, Karawang, West Java. Probably linked to the Tarumanagara kingdom in the 6th century AD.
- Bojongmenje, the ruins of a Hindu temple in Rancaekek, Bandung Regency.
- Candi Cangkuang, the only one of the surviving West Javanese Hindu temples to be dated as early as the 8th century. It is located in Leles, Garut, West Java, on an island in the middle of a lake covered by water lilies. Unlike other Javanese temples characterised by their grand architecture, Cangkuang temple is more modest, with only one structure still standing. A Shiva statue faces east toward the sunrise. Its exact date is uncertain.

==== Central Java ====
===== Dieng Plateau =====
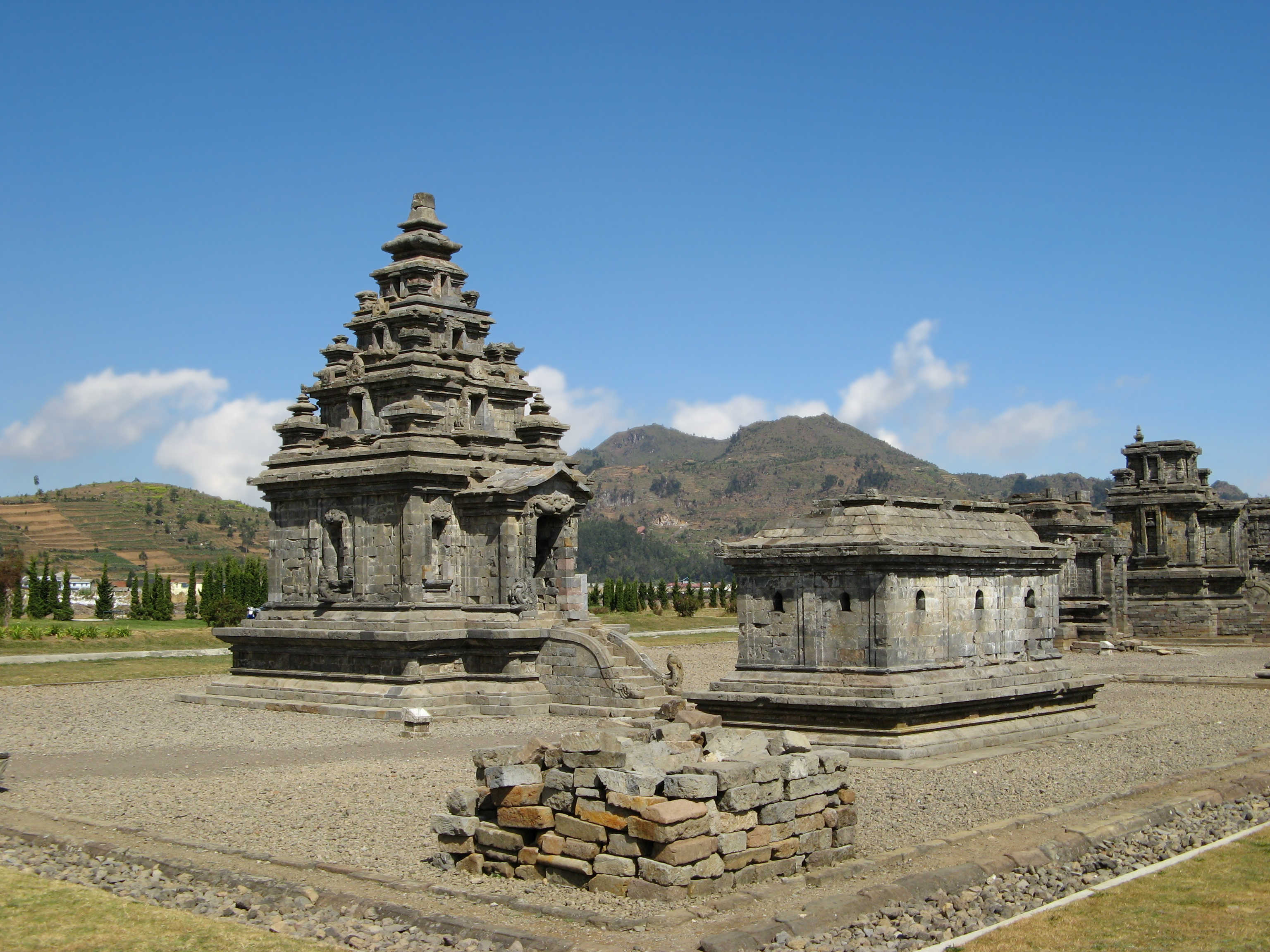
Arjuna group of Dieng temples

The Dieng temple compound is located on the Dieng Plateau, near Wonosobo, Central Java. The compound comprises eight small Hindu temples from the 7th and 8th centuries, which are the oldest in Central Java. The compound is surrounded by craters of boiling mud, colored lakes, caves, sulphur outlets, hot water sources and underground channels. The temples are:

- Arjuna temple
- Semar temple
- Srikandi temple
- Puntadewa temple
- Sembadra temple
- Dwarawati temple
- Gatotkaca temple
- Bima temple

===== Gedong Songo and surrounds =====
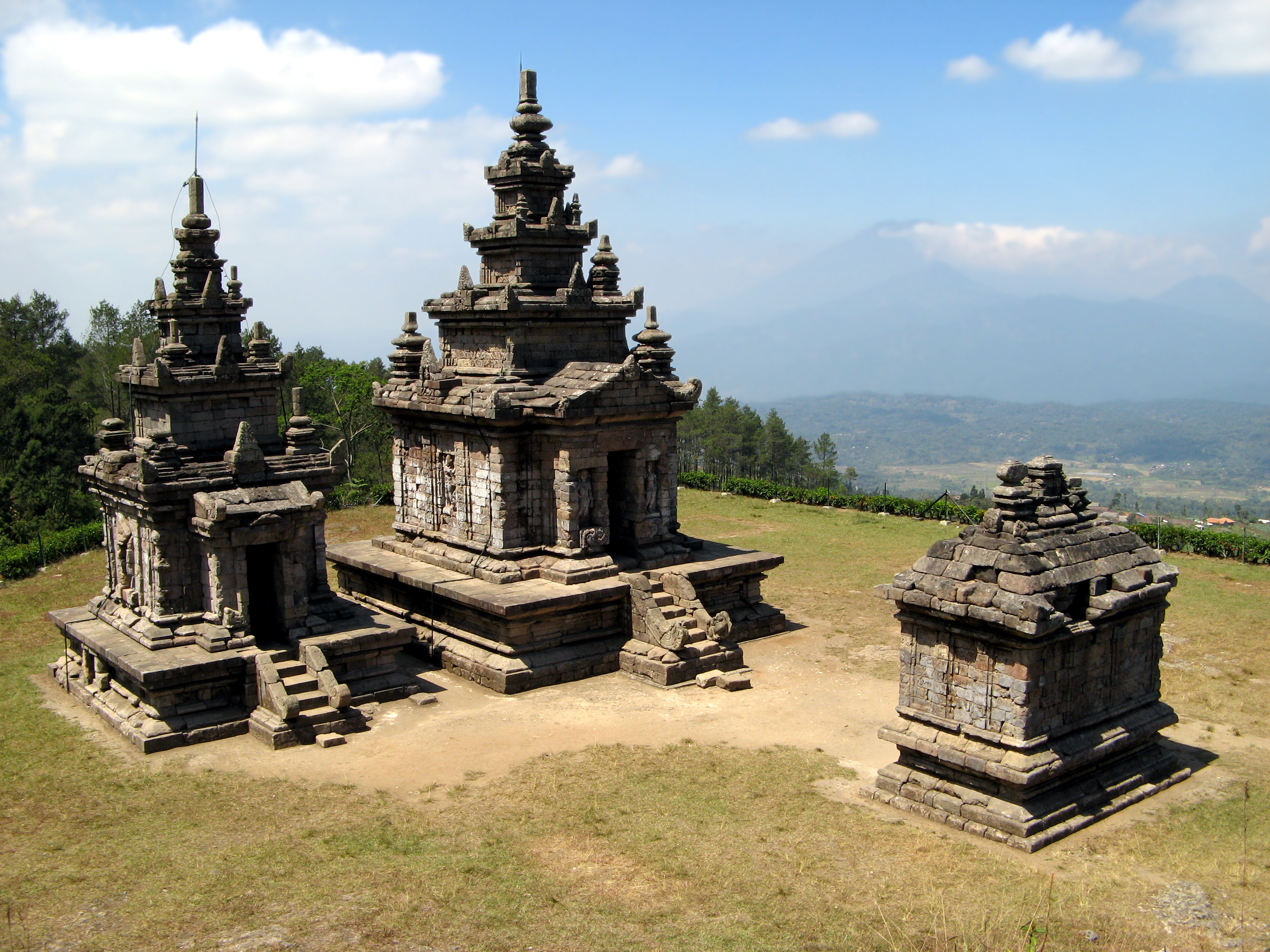
Gedong Songo III

- The Gedong Songo compound, south-west of Semarang, Central Java, comprises five temples constructed in the 8th and 9th centuries. The site highlights how, in Hinduism, the location of a temple was as important as the structure itself. The site has panoramas of three volcanoes and Dieng Plateau.
- Candi Klero, located in Tengaran district.
- Candi Ngempon, located in Bergas district.
- Candi Dukuh, located in Banyubiru District.

===== Borobudur and Kedu Plain =====
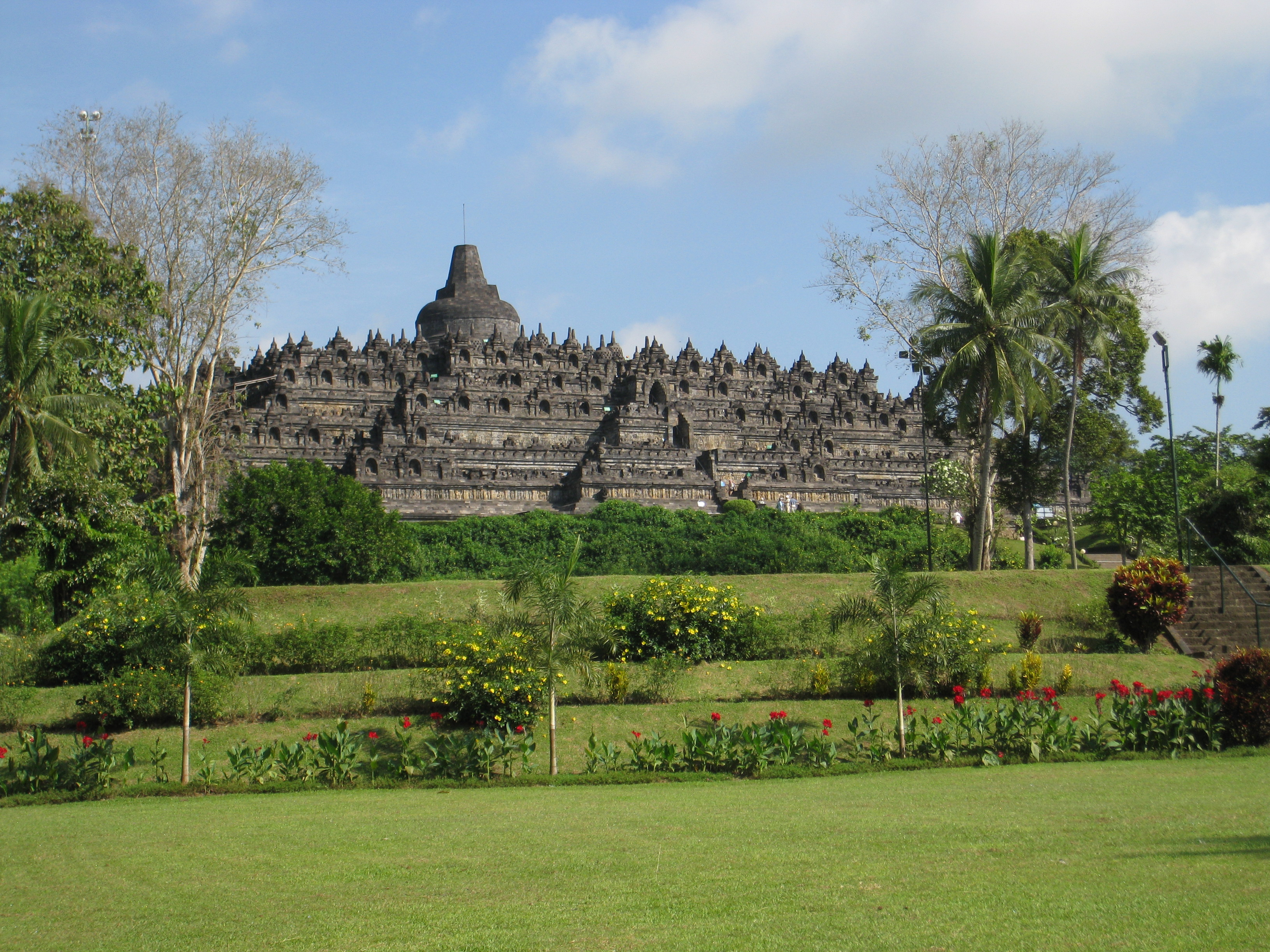
Borobudur

The Kedu Plain lies to the north west of Yogyakarta and west of Gunung Merapi and south west of Magelang, in Central Java.

- Borobudur, a 9th-century Buddhist monument, reportedly the world's largest. The seven terraces to the top represent the steps from the earthly realm to Nirvana. It contains reliefs of the birth, enlightenment and death of the Buddha. A UNESCO World Heritage Site.
- Pawon, an 8th-century Buddhist temple.
- Mendut, an 8th-century Mahayana Buddhist temple.
- Ngawen, an 8th-century Buddhist temple located east of Mendut temple. It contains five aligned sanctuaries, one decorated with finely sculpted lions. The name is linked to Venuvana, "the temple of bamboo forest".
- Banon, an 8th-century Hindu temple located north of Pawon temple. The few remains make it impossible to reconstruct the temple. The Hindu god statue from this temple is now located at the National Museum in Jakarta.
- Umbul, a 9th-century bathing complex in Grabag, Magelang.
- Gunung Sari, where the ruins of three secondary temples and the foot of the main temple remain.
- Gunung Wukir, where one of the oldest inscriptions on Java, written in 732 CE, was found. Only the bases of the main sanctuary and three secondary temples remain.

===== Slopes of Merapi =====
- The Sengi complex comprises three temples, Candi Asu, Candi Pendem and Candi Lumbung, Sengi, and is on the side of Mount Merapi. Dated to the 8th and 9th century. The base of the temple has a climbing plant motif.
- Gebang
- Morangan
- Pustakasala
- Lawang

===== Near Yogyakarta =====
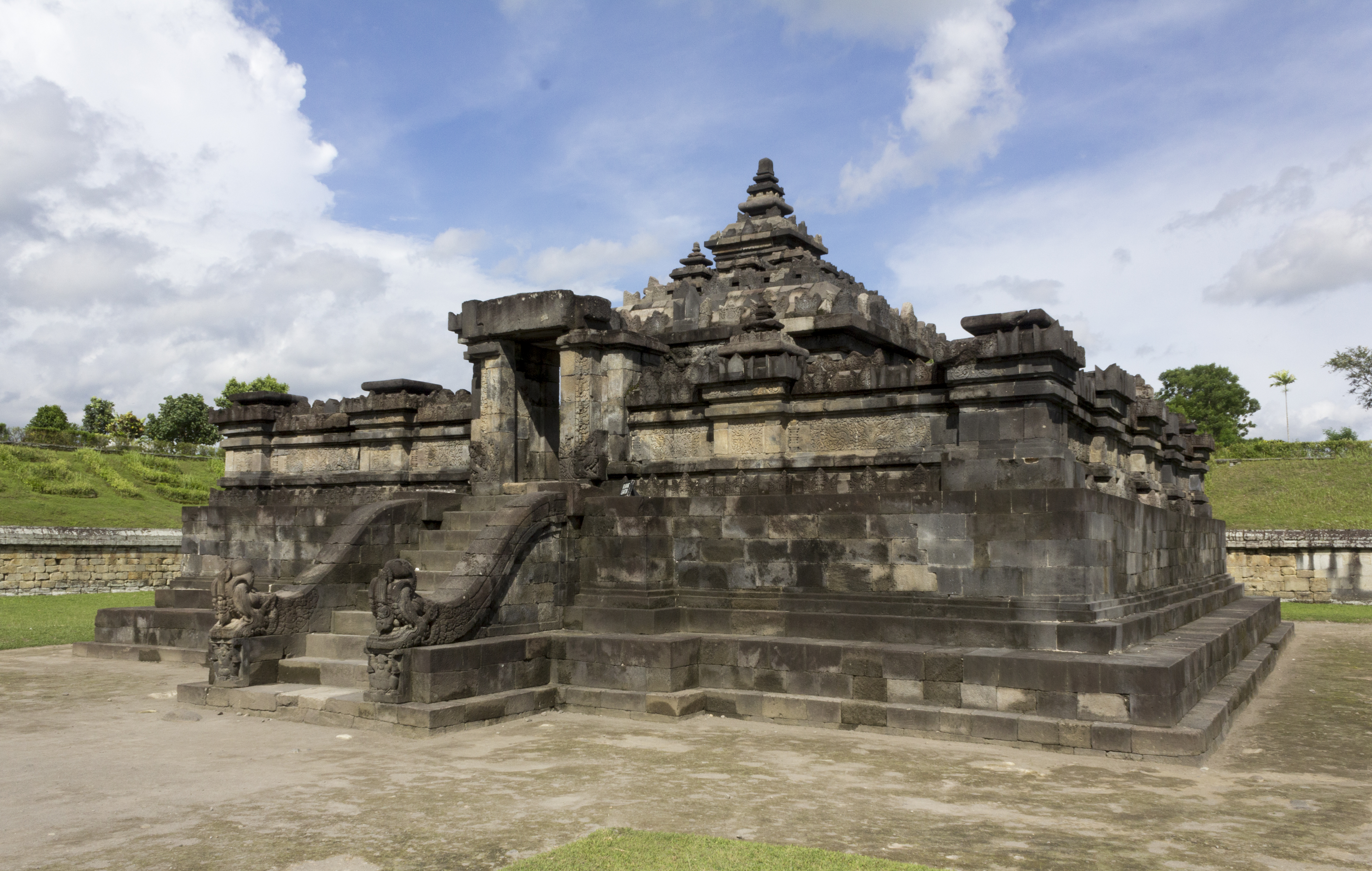
Sambisari

- Candi Sambisari, a 10th-century underground Hindu temple buried by eruptions from Mount Merapi for a century. It was discovered in 1966 by a farmer plowing his field.
- Candi Kadisoka, an uncompleted 8th-century temple buried by eruptions from Merapi. Thought to have been Hindu temple, it was discovered in 2000.

===== Prambanan Plain =====
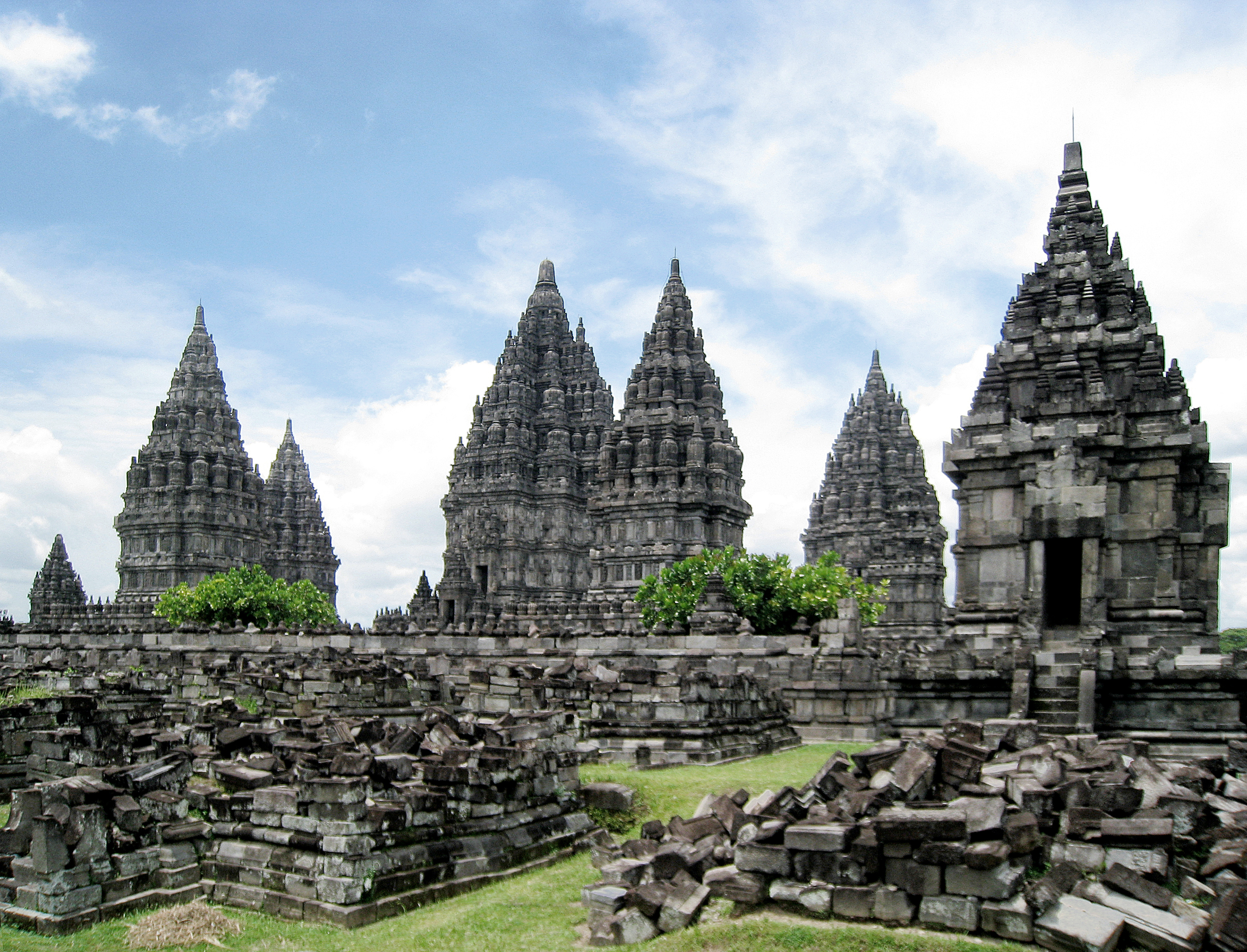
The Prambanan temple complex

- Roro Jonggrang, the main Prambanan complex. A 9th century Hindu temple called the "Slender Maiden". The main temple is dedicated to Shiva and is flanked by temples to Visnu and Brahma. The reliefs depict Ramayana stories.
- Sewu, a Buddhist temple complex, older than Roro Jonggrang. There is a main sanctuary surrounded by many smaller temples. It contains well preserved guardian statues, replicas of which stand in the central courtyard at the Jogja Kraton.
- Candi Lumbung, a Buddhist temple ruin located south of Sewu temple, consisting of one main temple surrounded by 16 smaller ones.
- Bubrah, a Buddhist temple located between Candi Lumbung and Candi Sewu.
- Candi Gana, a Buddhist temple ruin rich in statues, bas-reliefs and sculpted stones. There are frequent representations of children or dwarfs with raised hands. It is located east of the Sewu complex, in the middle of housing complex, and has been under restoration since 1997.
- Plaosan, a Buddhist temple compound located few kilometers east of the Sewu temple, probably dated to the 9th century. It is thought to have been built by a Hindu king for his Buddhist queen. Two main temples contain reliefs of a man and a woman and there are slender stupa.
- Arca Bugisan, seven Buddha and bodhisattva statues, some collapsed, representing different poses and expressions.
- Sajiwan, a Buddhist temple decorated with reliefs concerning education. The base and staircase are decorated with animal fables.
- Candi Sari, once a sanctuary for Buddhist priests. It is dated to the 8th century. There are nine stupas at the top with two rooms beneath, each believed to be places for priests to meditate.
- Candi Kalasan, an 8th-century Buddhist temple built in commemoration of the marriage of a king and his princess bride, ornamented with finely carved reliefs.
- Candi Kedulan, discovered in 1994 by sand diggers, 4m deep. The square base of main temple is visible. The secondary temples have not yet been fully excavated.

===== Ratu Boko and surrounds =====
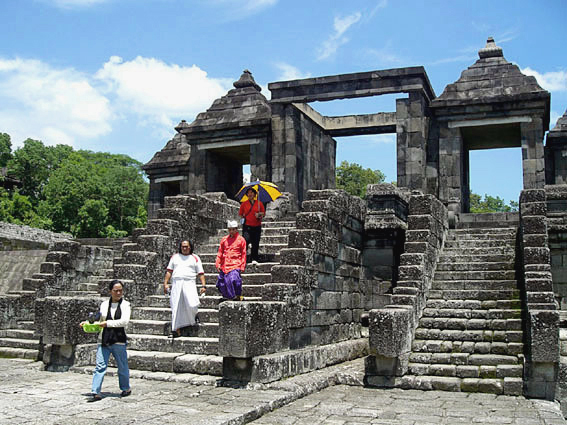
The gate of Ratu Boko Palace compound

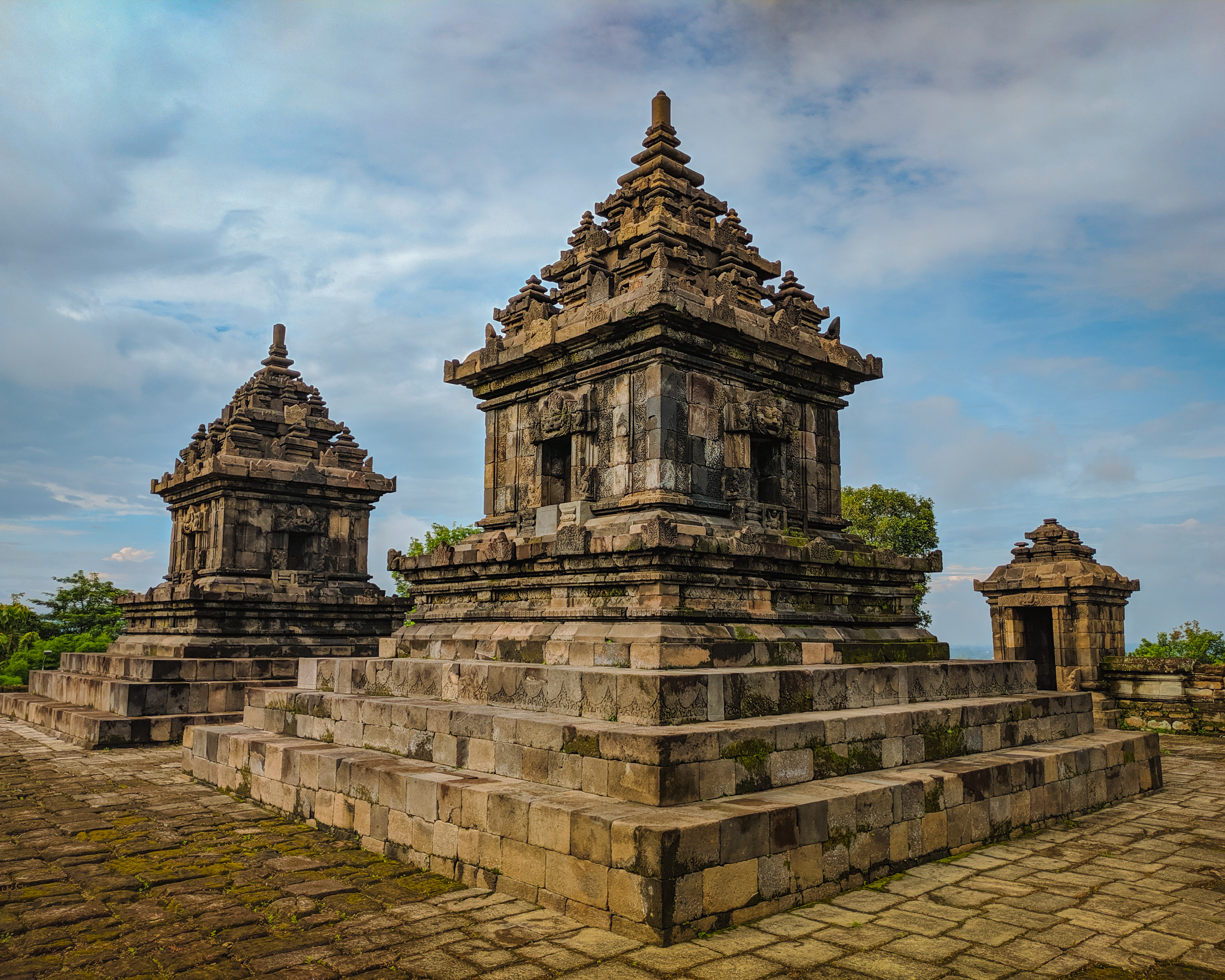
Candi Barong

- Ratu Boko, built between the 8th and 9th centuries. It is a mix between Buddhist and Hindu styles. There is a partially restored palace auditorium and the ruins of the royal garden with a bathing pool inside.
- Arca Gopolo, a group of seven statues in a circle, as if in assembly. Flower decoration on the clothes of the largest are still visible.
- Banyunibo, a small 9th-century Buddhist complex. There is one main temple surrounded by six smaller ones, forming a stupa. Its restoration was completed in 1978.
- Barong, two almost identical temples on terraces. They are believed to be 9th-century Hindu temples and part of a sacred complex, of which they were the crown.
- Dawangsari, perhaps the site of a destroyed Buddhist stupa, now reduced to an array of andesite stones.
- Candi Ijo, a complex of three-tiered temples, although only one has been renovated. There is one main sanctuary and three secondary shrines with statues. The rest are still under reconstruction.
- Watugudig, a group of pole sittings in the shape of a Javanese gong. About 40 have been discovered, but others may remain buried. Locals believe this to be the resting place of King Boko.
- Candi Abang, actually a well that looks like a pyramid with very tall walls. In some aspects it looks like Borobudur and has a unique atmosphere.
- Candi Gampingan, ruins, 1.1.5 m (4.9 ft) underground, of a temple and stairs. Reliefs of animals at the foot of the temple are believed to be a fable.
- Sentono, at the base of Abang temple. It is perhaps younger than other regional temples. The complex is made of caves with two mouths, and there is a statue and bas-relief in the left chamber.
- Situs Payak, the best preserved bathing place in Central Java. It is 5m below ground and thought to be Hindu.

===== Klaten Regency =====
- Candi Merak, two 10th-century Hindu temples located in the middle of a village east of Yogyakarta, in the Klaten Regency. The temples are rich in reliefs and decorations.
- Candi Karangnongko, which is difficult to date because there are few remains.

===== Mount Lawu =====
- Candi Cetho, on the slopes of Mount Lawu, Near Surakarta. It is a 15th-century Hindu temple 1,470 m (4,820 ft) above sea level.
- Candi Sukuh, on the slopes of Mount Lawu. It is a 15th-century Hindu complex resembling a Mayan temple. Reliefs illustrate life before birth and sex education.
- Candi Watu Genuk, estimated to be from the 8th century and located in Mojosongo, Boyolali
- Candi Sari and Candi Lawang, located near Mount Merapi and Mount Merbabu in Cepogo, Boyolali

==== East Java ====
===== Malang area =====
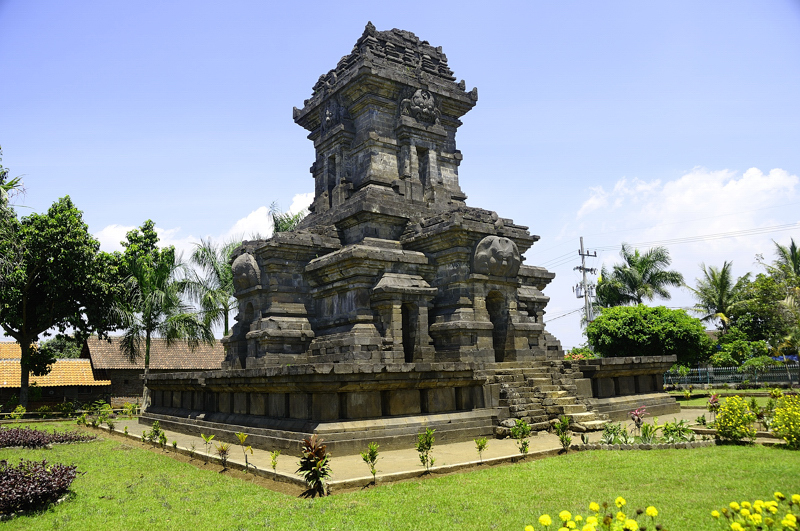
Singosari

- Candi Badut, also known as Liswa temple, a small Shivaite temple dating from the 8th century, located west of Malang.
- Candi Songgoriti, very similar to Candi Sembrada at Dieng. This Hindu temple is located in a valley between Mount Arjuna and Mount Kawi, East Java
- Candi Jago, dated to the late 13th century. Terraces are decorated with reliefs in the distinctive Javanese shadow puppet style with scenes from the Mahabharata epic and underworld demons.
- Candi Singosari, dedicated to the kings of the Singosari Dynasty (1222 to 1292 AD), the precursors of the Majapahit Kingdom. It was built in 1304.
- Arca Dwarapala, dedicated to the kings of the Singosari Dynasty.
- Candi Kidal
- Sumberawan
- Candi Rambut Monte
- Candi Selakelir

===== Blitar area =====
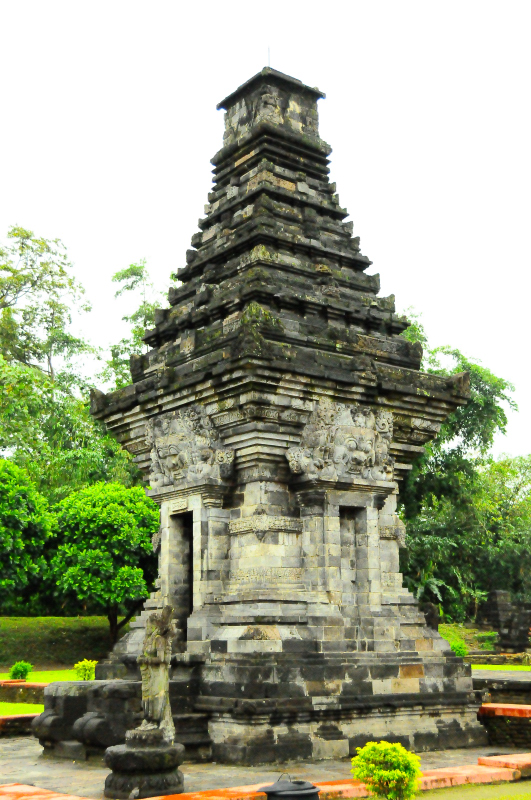
Penataran

- Candi Penataran, East Java's only sizable temple complex, with a series of shrines and pavilions. They were constructed in the 12th to 15th centuries and are believed to be the state temple of the Majapahit Empire.
- Candi Bacem
- Candi Boro
- Candi Kalicilik
- Candi Kotes
- Candi Wringin Branjang
- Candi Sawentar
- Candi Sumbernanas
- Candi Sumberjati or Candi Simping
- Candi Gambar Wetan
- Candi Plumbangan
- Candi Tepas

===== Kediri area =====
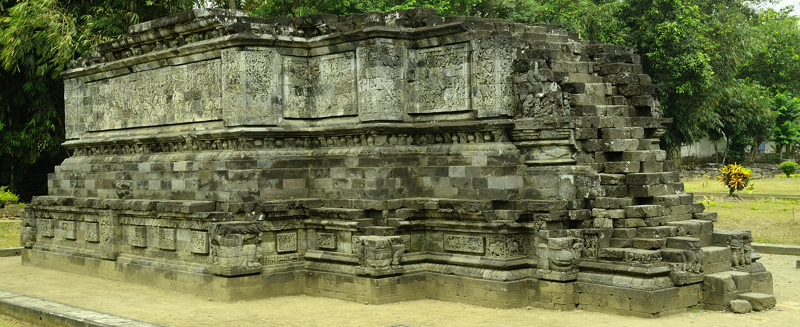
Surowono

- Candi Adan-adan, a Buddhist temple located on the northeast slope of Kelud volcano near Kediri town, specifically in Adan-adan village, Gurah subdistrict, Kediri Regency, East Java. The temple was discovered in 2017. It has an exquisite fragment of a Boddhisattva head and dvarapala guardian.
- Candi Surowono, a small temple of the Majapahit Kingdom, located in the Canggu Village of the Kediri district, near Pare, in Java, Indonesia. It is believed to have been built in 1390 AD as a memorial to Wijayarajasa, the Prince of Wengker.
- Candi Tegowangi
- Arca Totok Kerot
- Arca Mbah Budho
- Candi Dorok
- Candi Tondowongso
- Gua Selomangleng
- Gua Selobale
- Calon Arang Site, a site which inspired the Leak dance of Bali.
- Babadan or SumberCangkring Site
- Prasasti Pohsarang
- Candi Setono Gedong, today a mosque, found near Sidoarjo, Tretes, and Probolinggo.

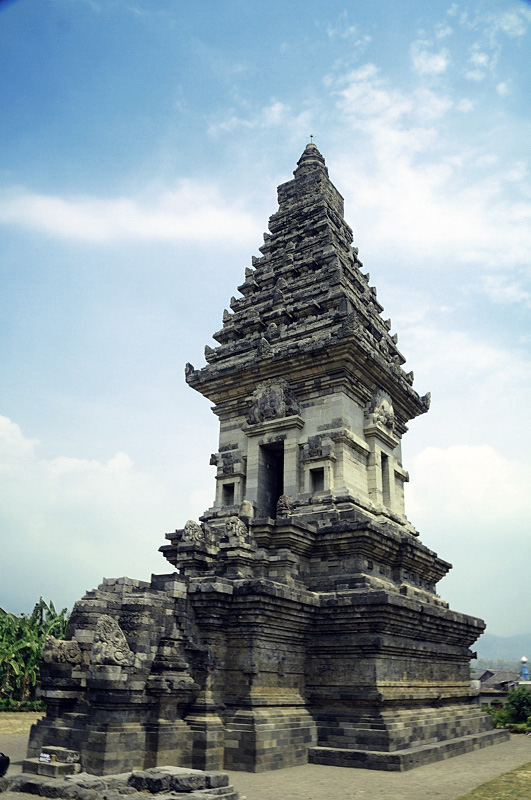
Jawi

- Dermo, a 13.5 m high gapura made of red bricks, located in Sidoarjo.
- Pari, dated to 1293 Saka (1371 CE) and located in Sidoarjo, this Majapahit red brick temple bears similarity to temples with Champa architecture.
- Candi Sumur, located just a hundred meters from Candi Pari, probably built in the same era.
- Gunung Gangsir, located in Gunung Gangsir hamlet, Beji village, Pasuruan Regency, about 18 kilometres east of Pasuruan city.
- Candi Jawi, a 13th-century funerary temple. It is a slender Shiva-Buddhist shrine completed around 1300 and located in Tretes.
- The Penanggungan sites on Mount Penanggungan, contain terraced sanctuaries, meditation grottoes and sacred pools. There are about 80 sites in all, including Candi Belahan, which is believed to be the burial site of King Airlangga who died in 1049.
- Candi Jabung, dated to 1276 saka (1354 CE) according to the inscription on the top of the temple portal. It is located east of Probolinggo, near Kraksaan.
- Candi Kedaton Probolinggo, an Andesite Hindu temple located in Tiris, Probolinggo.

===== Trowulan =====
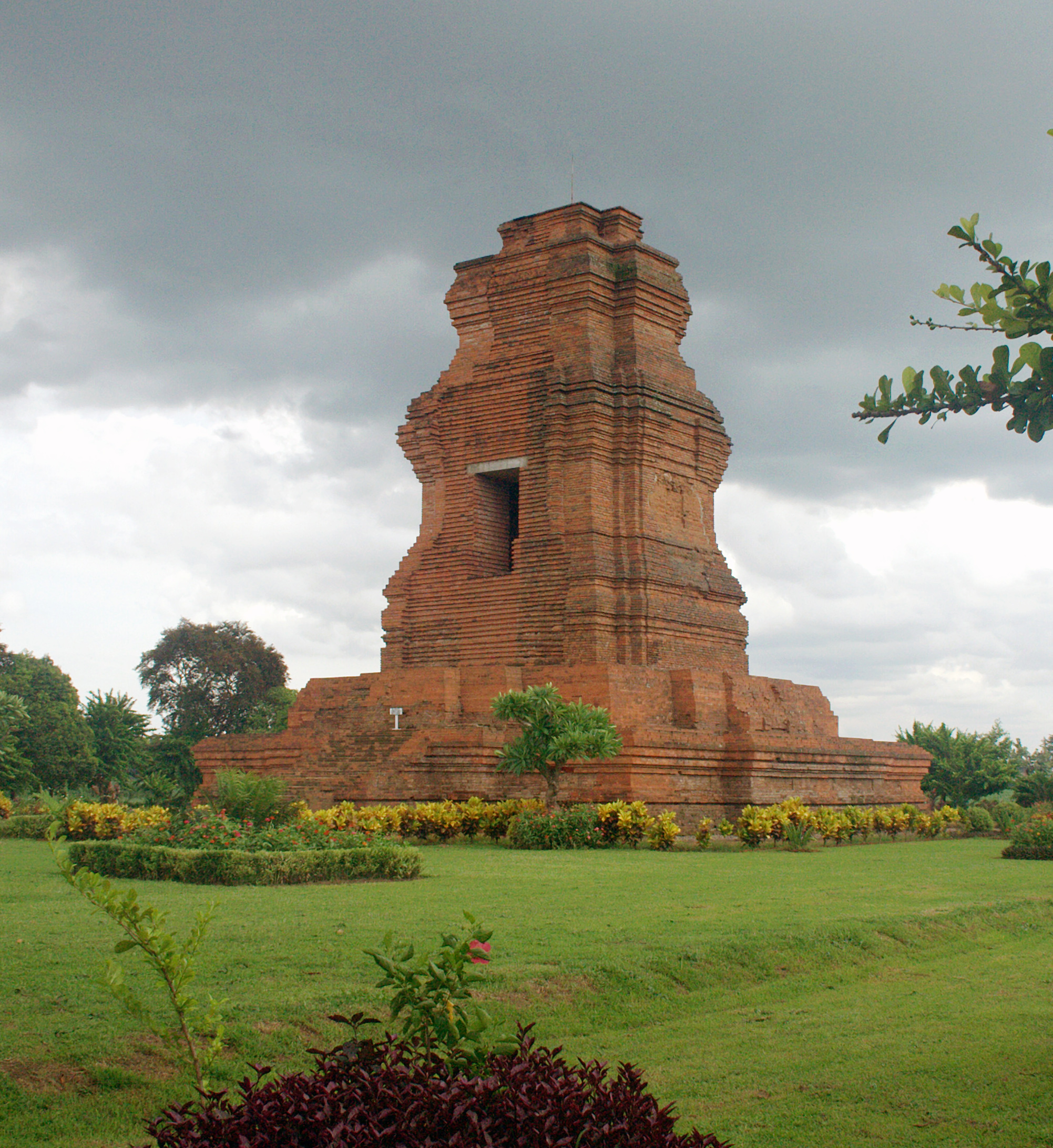
Candi Brahu, Trowulan

- Candi Tikus, located in Trowulan, which was once the capital of the Majapahit kingdom and the controller of most of the important ports of the day. It survived thanks to a sophisticated irrigation system. Tikus held the run-off water from Mount Penanggungan used for sanctification rites. The site also contains parts of the palace gate, entryway and water system.
- Candi Brahu, located in Bejijong village. Brahu Temple is a Buddhist temple, built in the 15 century and restored between 1990 and 1995. The temple's function is unknown.
- Candi Gentong, located 350m east of Brahu temple. Many ceramics from the Ming and Yuan Dynasties have been found in this temple area.
- Candi Muteran, located north of Brahu temple. The temple's function is unknown.
- Kolam Segaran, a pond of Majapahit heritage. The Pond was found in 1926 by Henri Maclain Pont. Its first restoration ran from 1966 till 1984. The pond functioned as a place for recreation and greeting foreign guests. This was the biggest ancient pond found in Indonesia.
- Gapura Bajang Ratu
- Gerbang Wringin Lawang

===== Mojokerto =====
- Candi Bangkal, located in Mojokerto Regency.
- Candi Jolotundo, also known as Petirtaan Jolotundo.
- Candi Jedong
- Candi Kedaton Trowulan, a red brick structure that may have been the foundation of a candi.
- Candi Minak Jinggo

=== Bali ===
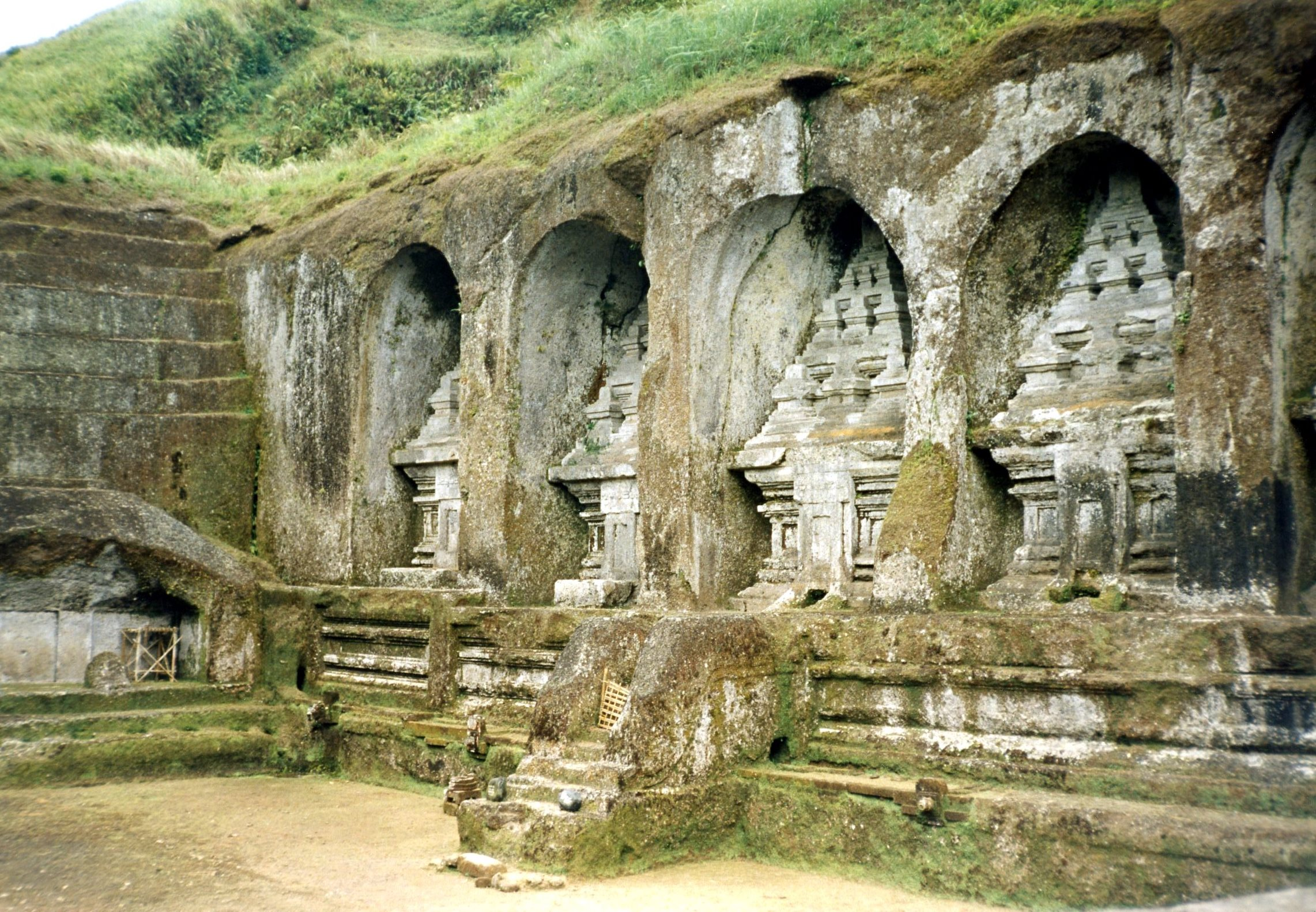
Gunung Kawi, Bali

- Candi Gunung Kawi, located in Sebatu village, Tampak Siring area, Gianyar Regency. It is one of the oldest temple in Bali, dated to 989 CE. The five temples are carved on the stone slopes, forming grottoes.
- Candi Kalibukbuk, located in Kalibukbuk village, Buleleng Regency. It is one of the few Buddhist temple in Hindu dominated Bali. The temple is thought to be dated to the 8th century.
- Candi Mengening, located in Banjar Sarasada, Tampaksiring village, Gianyar Regency. Dated to the reign of king Marakata, circa 1022 CE.

=== Sumatra ===
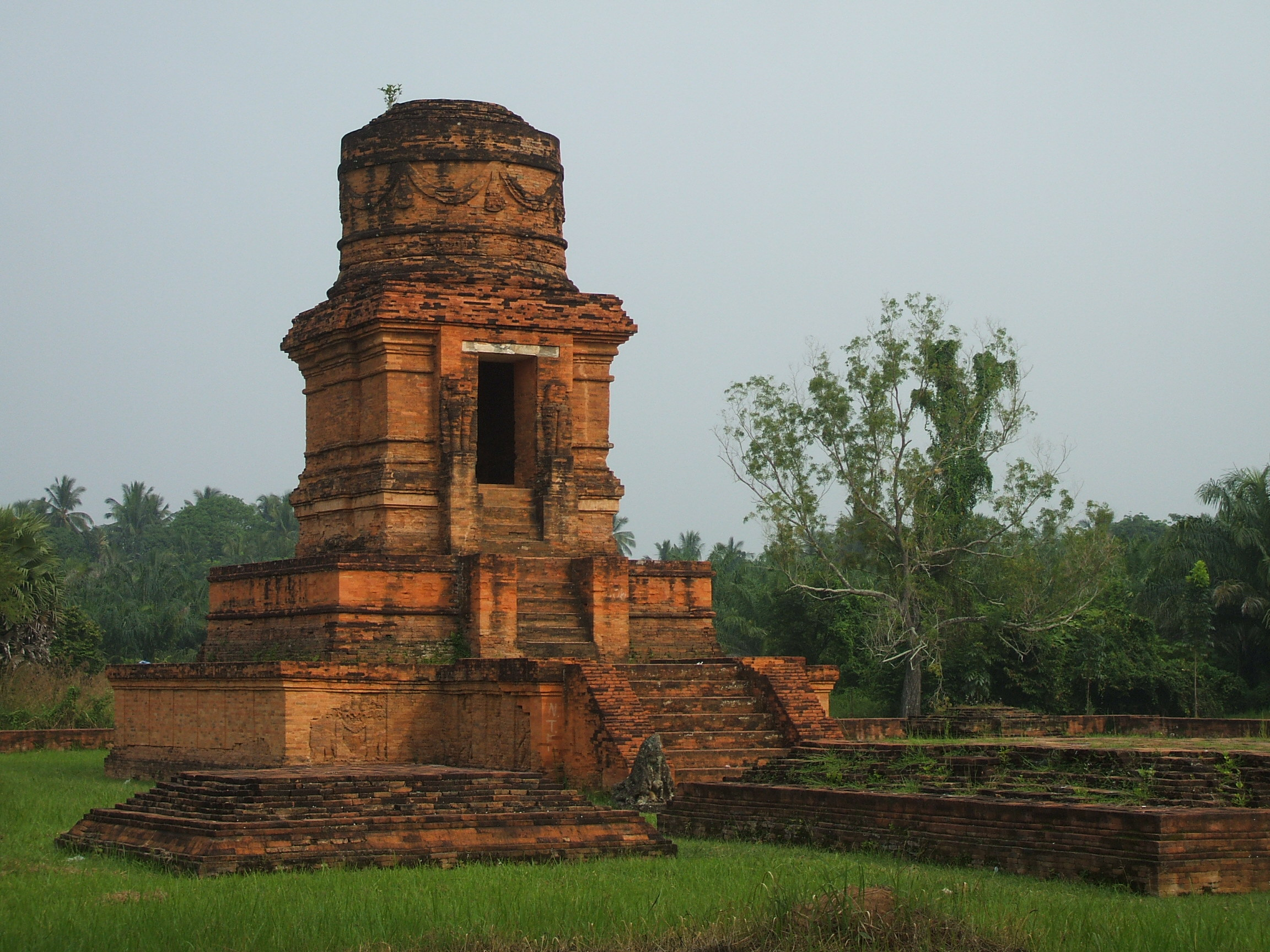
Biaro Bahal, North Sumatra

- Candi Biaro Bahal, South Tapanuli, North Sumatra
- Candi Bumiayu, South Sumatra
- Candi Muara Takus, Riau
- Candi Muaro Jambi, Jambi

=== Kalimantan ===
- Candi Agung, a Hindu Candi located in North Hulu Sungai, South Kalimantan. South Kalimantan was a base of the Hindu Kingdom of Negara Dipa, which was then inherited by Negara Daha.
- Candi Laras, a Hindu Candi located in Tapin, South Kalimantan. The Buddhist Kingdom in South Kalimantan was represented by the kingdom of Tanjung Puri.

== Gallery ==
Indonesian candi, Hindu-Buddhist temples, the oldest dated to about the 2nd century and the latest to about the 15th century.

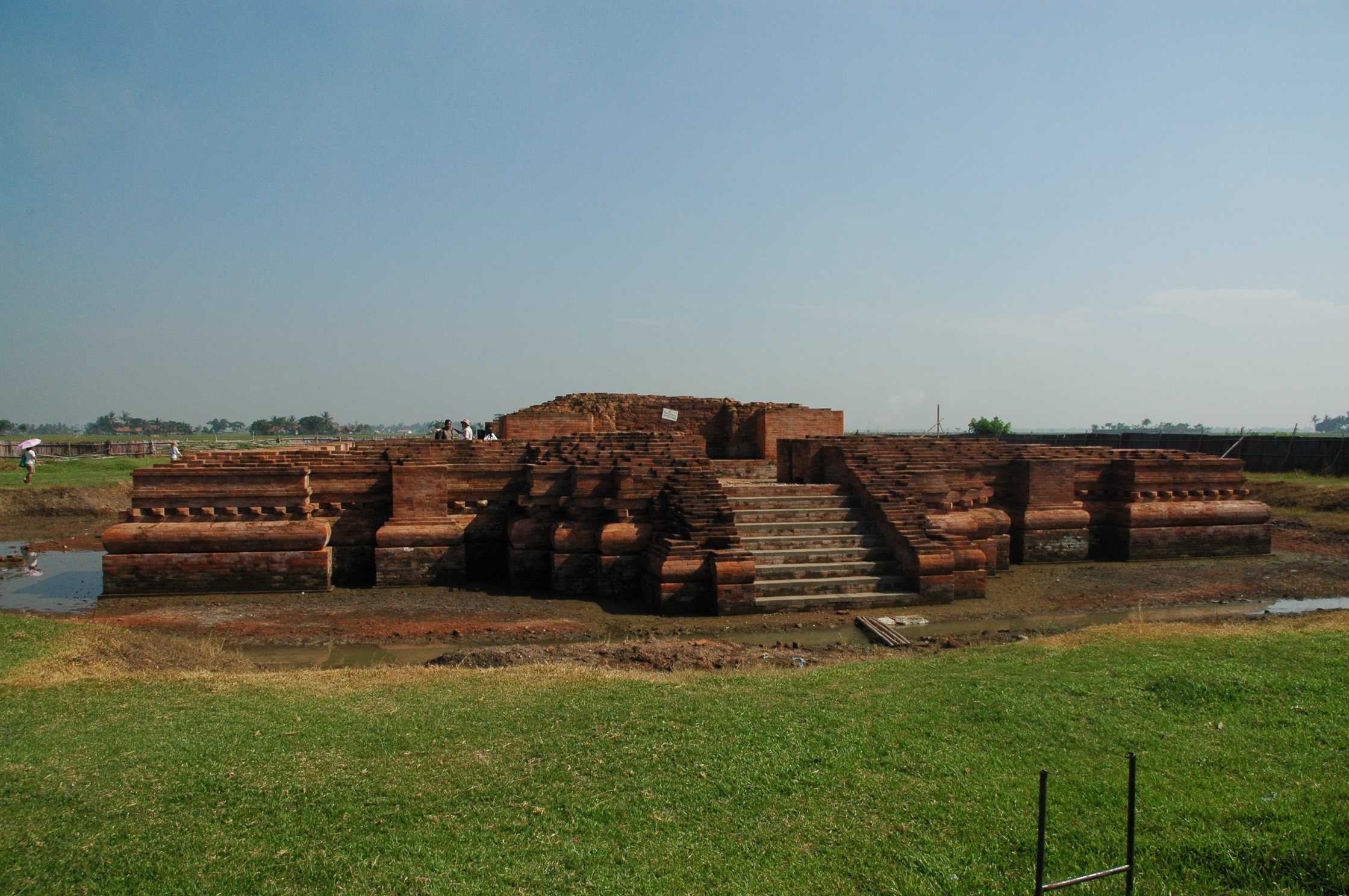
Blandongan, Batujaya, 2nd to 12th century, Karawang, West Java

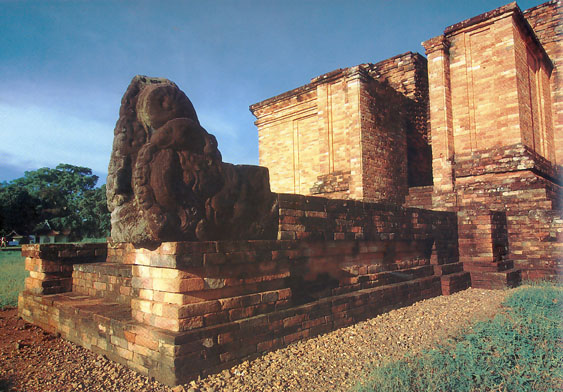
Gumpung, Muaro Jambi, 7th–12th century, Jambi

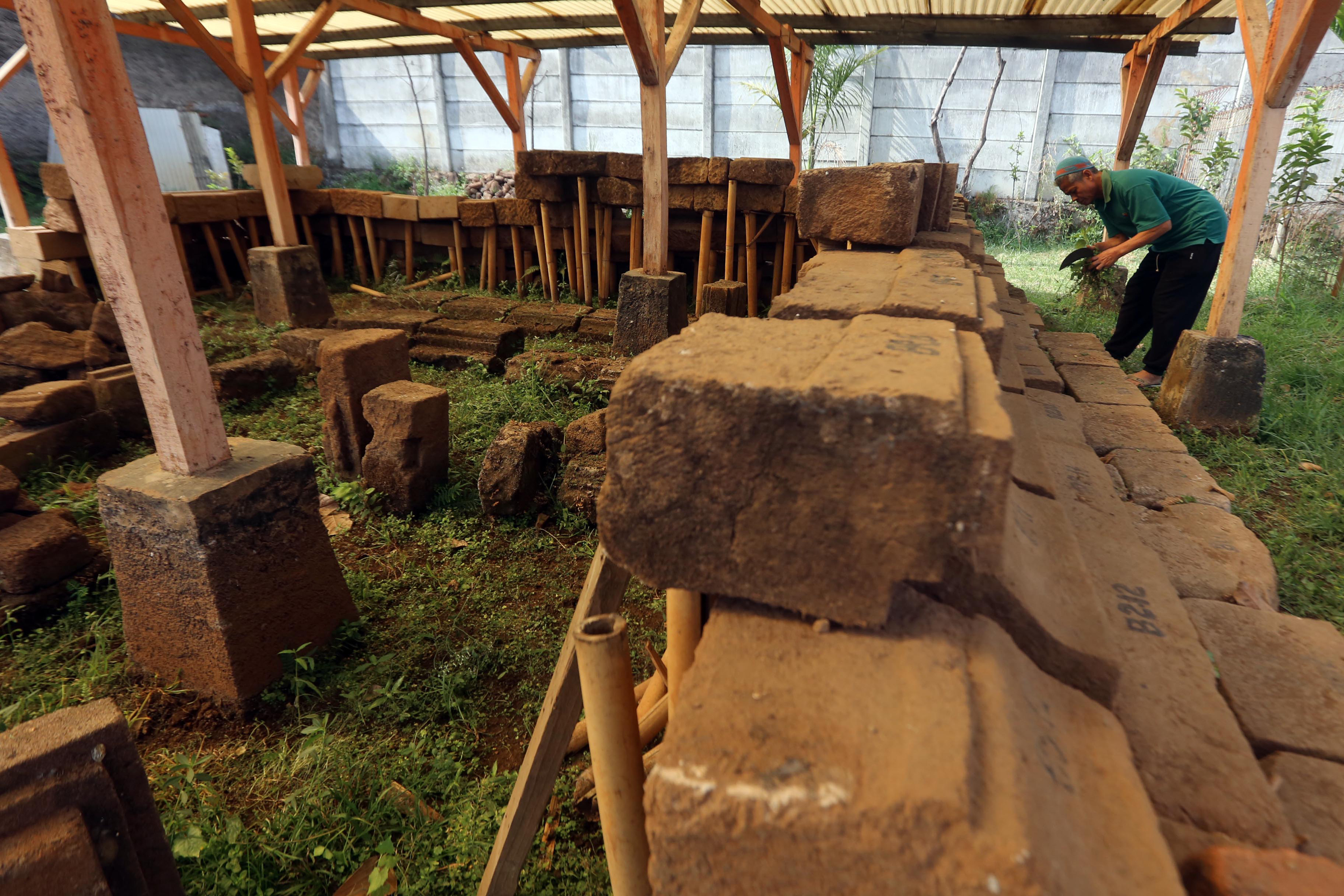
Bojongmenje, 7th century, Rancaekek, Bandung, West Java

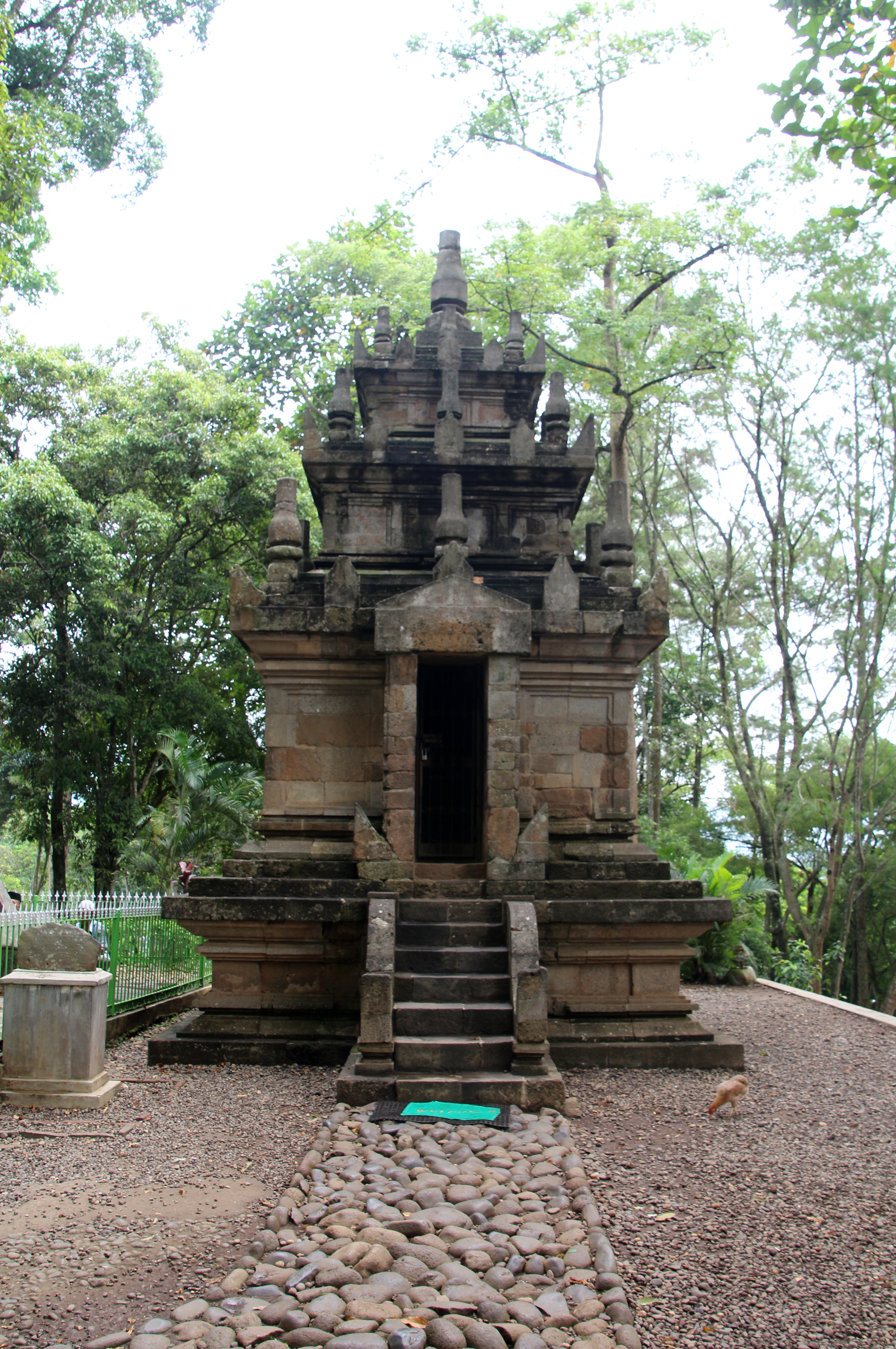
Cangkuang, 8th century, Leles, Garut, West Java

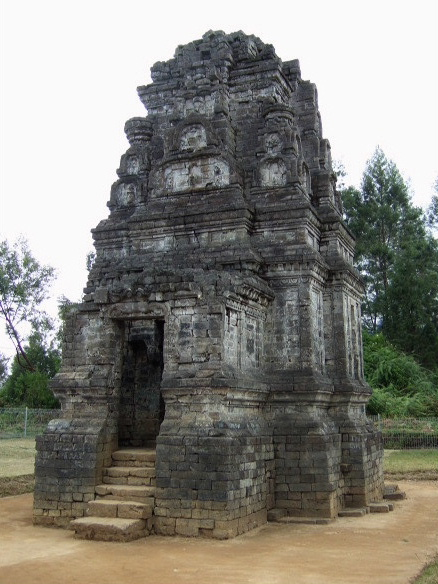
Candi Bima, 7th–8th century, Dieng Plateau

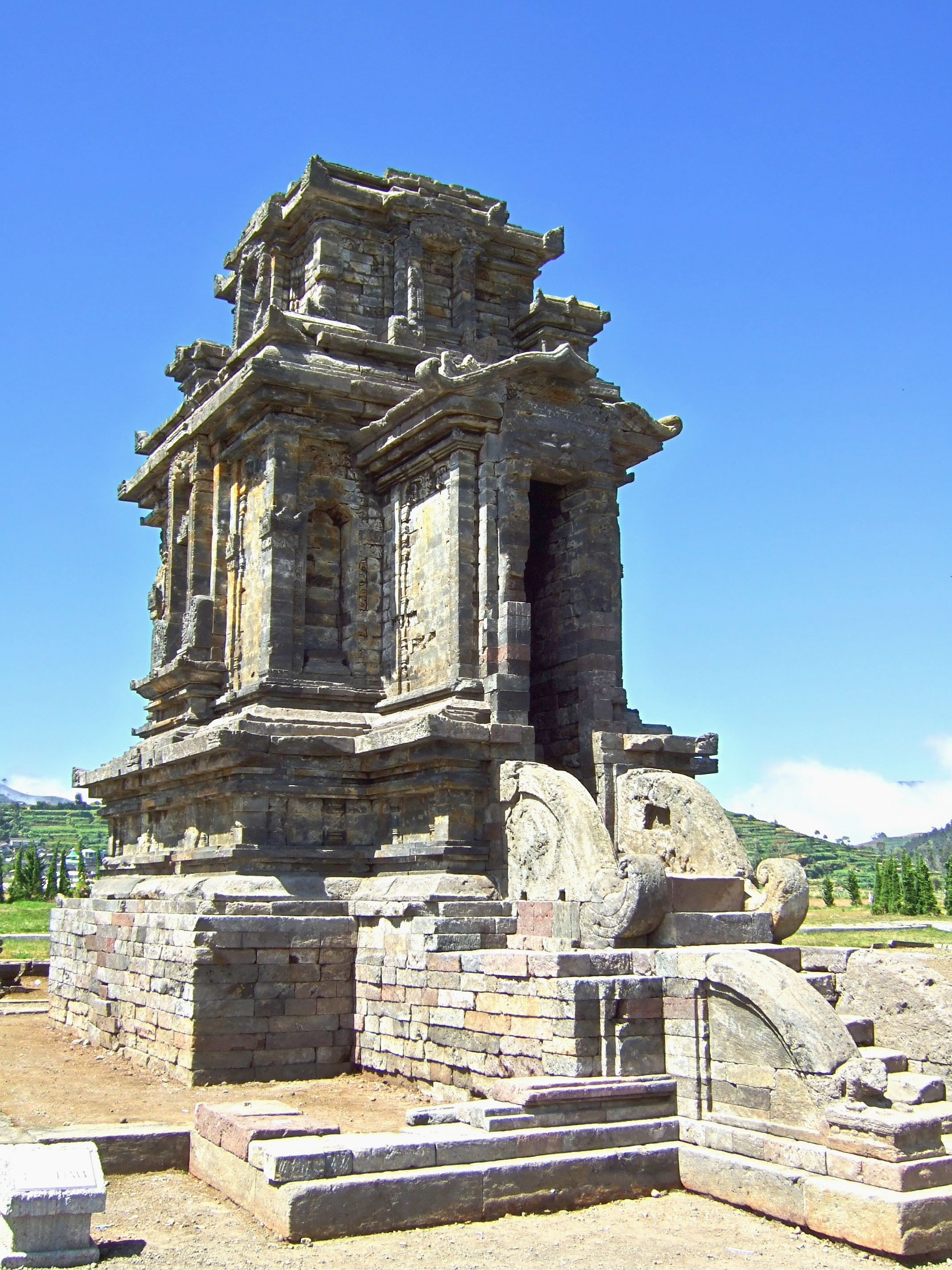
Candi Puntadewa, 7th–8th century, Dieng Plateau

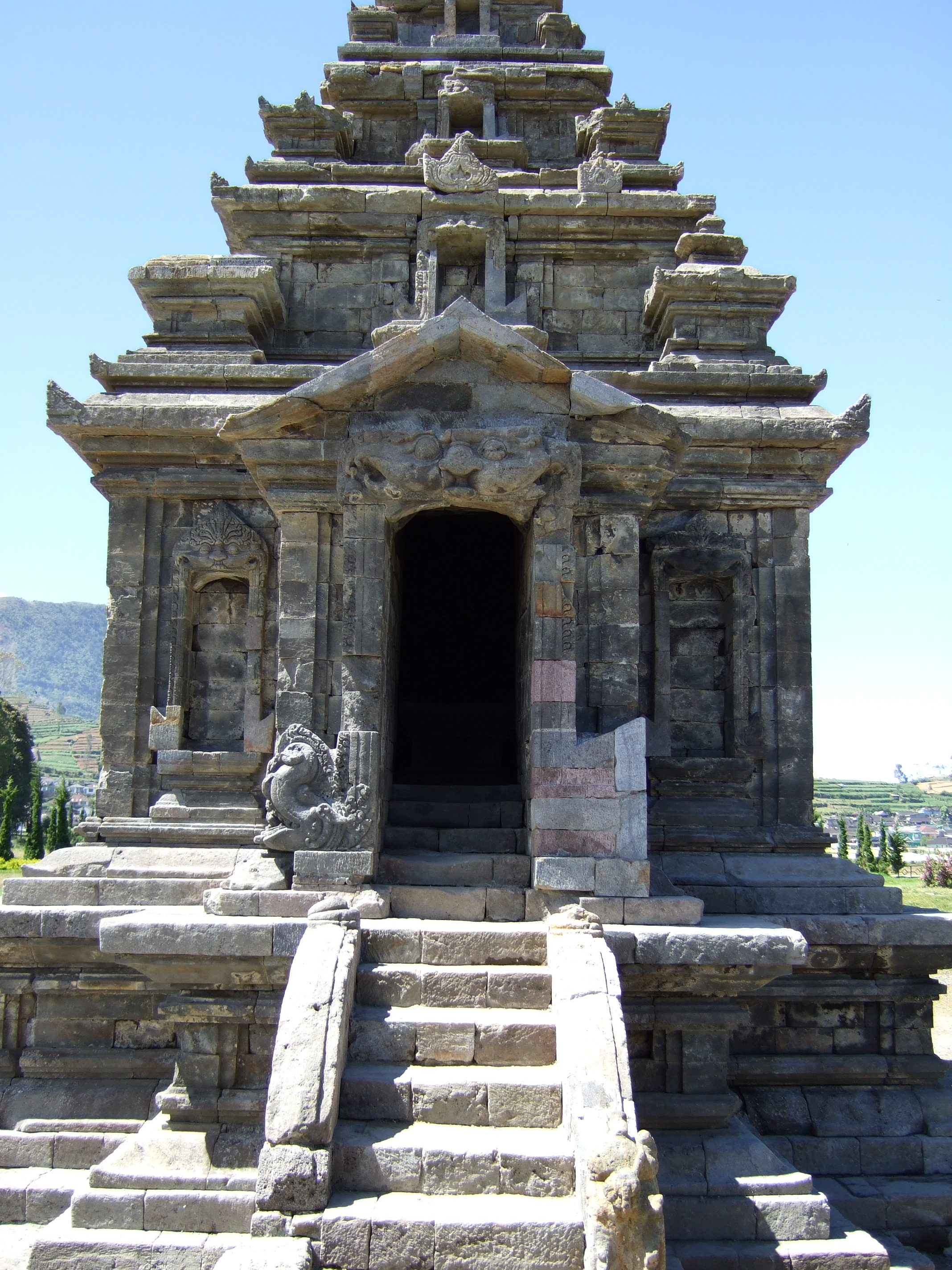
Candi Arjuna, 7th–8th century, Dieng Plateau

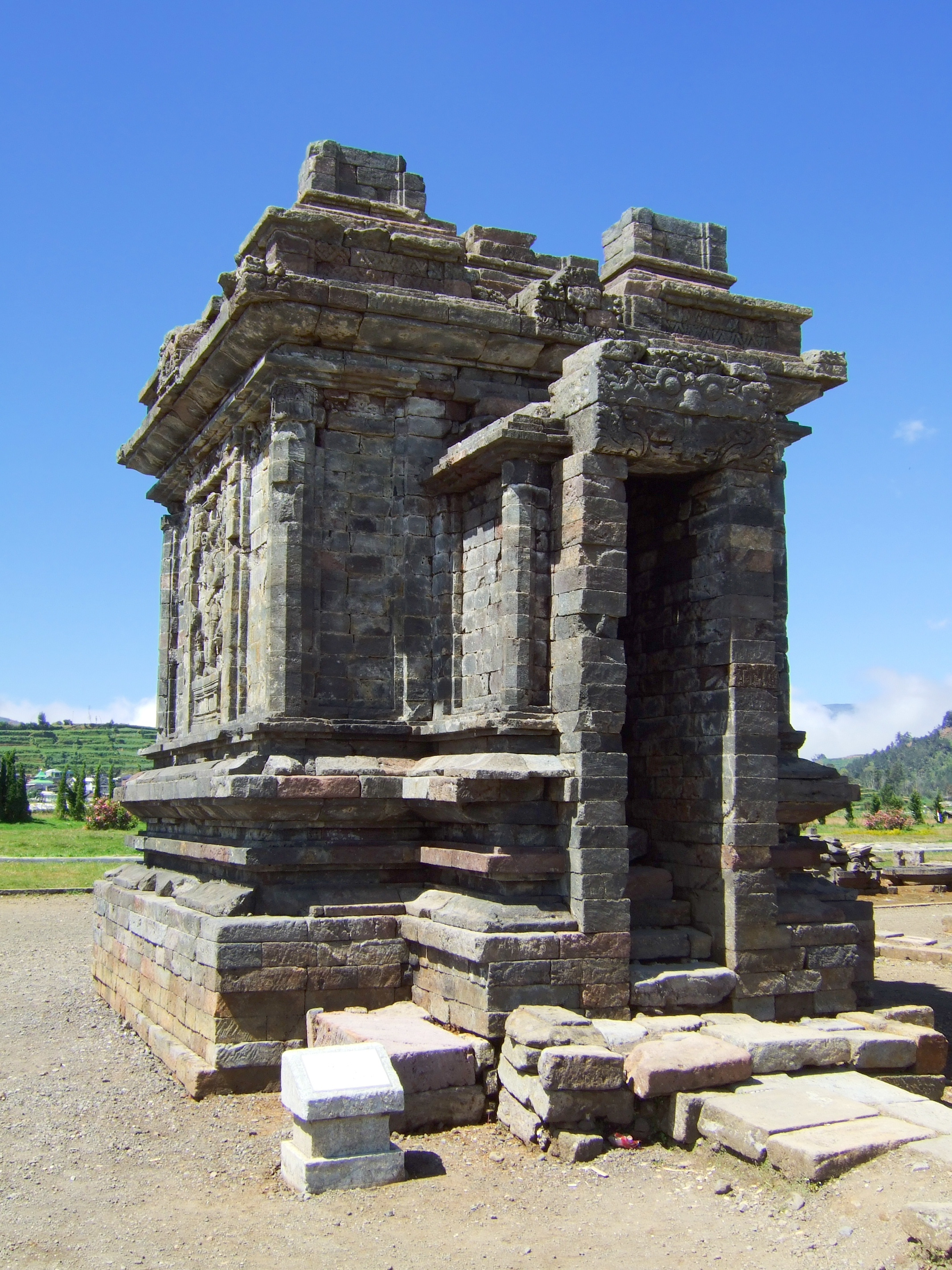
Candi Srikandi, 7th–8th century, Dieng Plateau

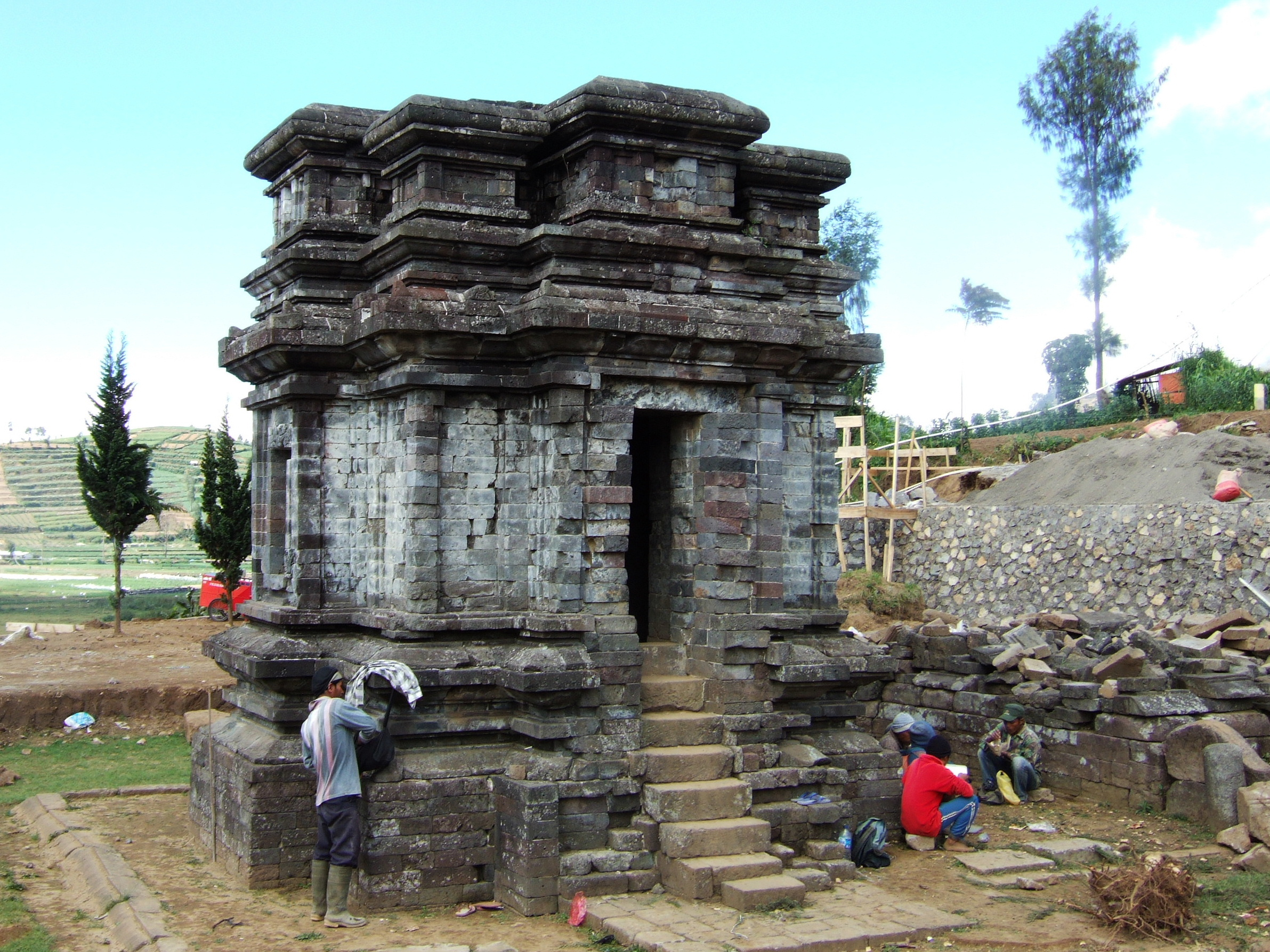
Candi Gatotkaca, 7th–8th century, Dieng Plateau

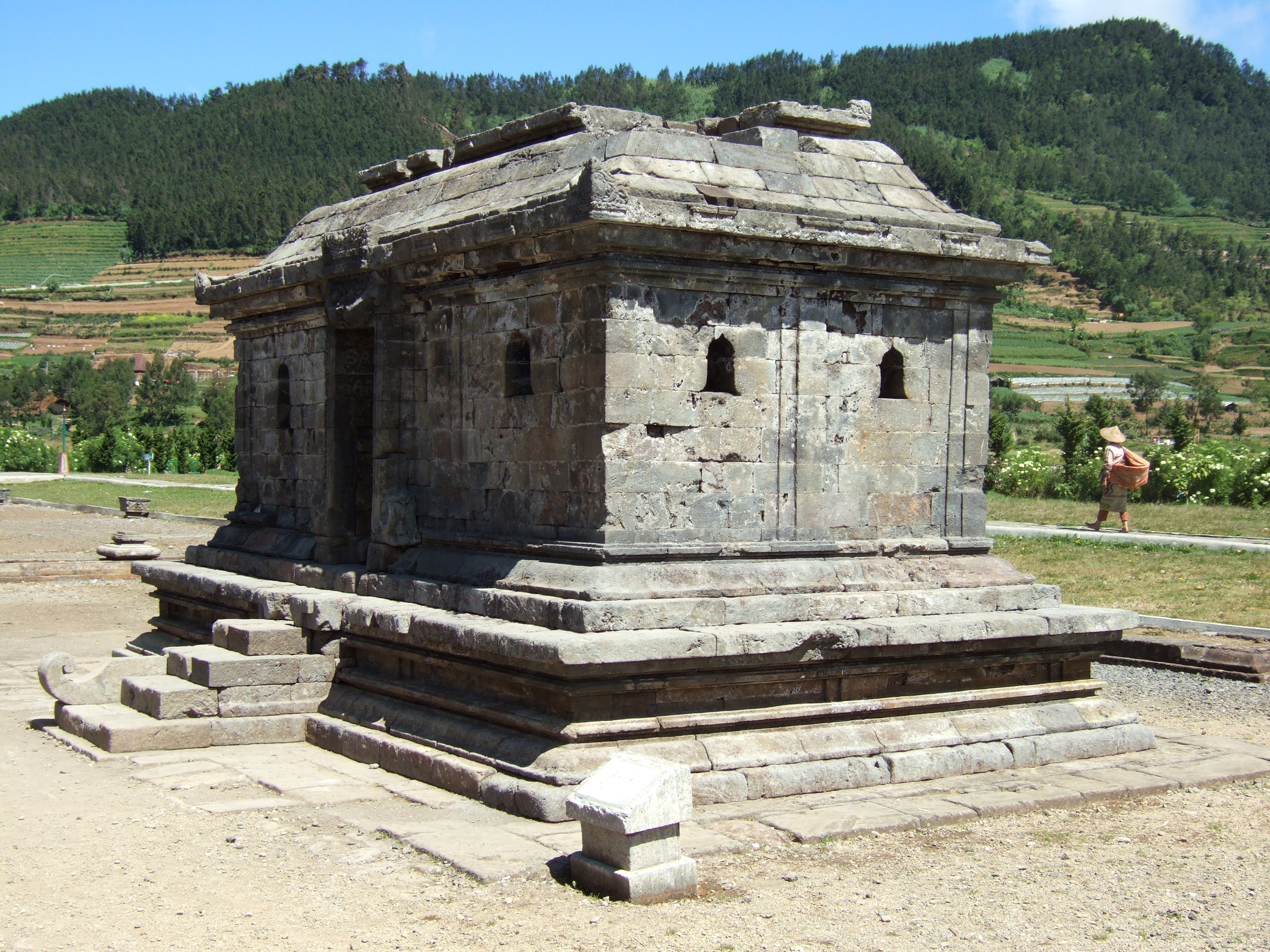
Candi Semar, 7th–8th century, Dieng Plateau

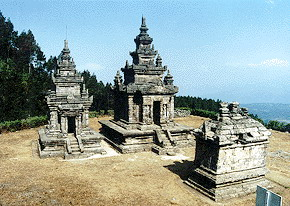
Candi Gedong Songo, 7th–8th century, Ungaran

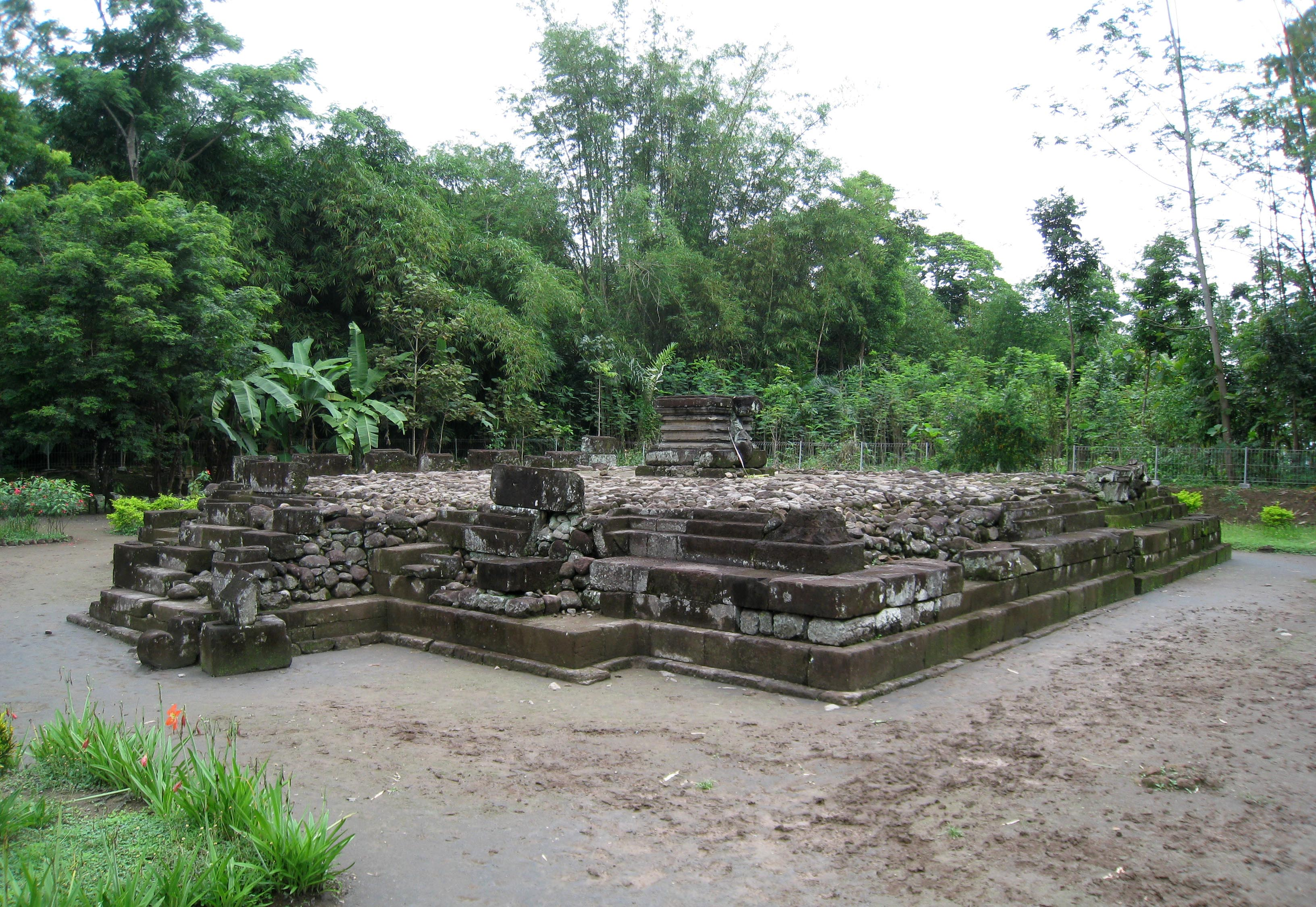
Gunung Wukir, 8th century, Muntilan

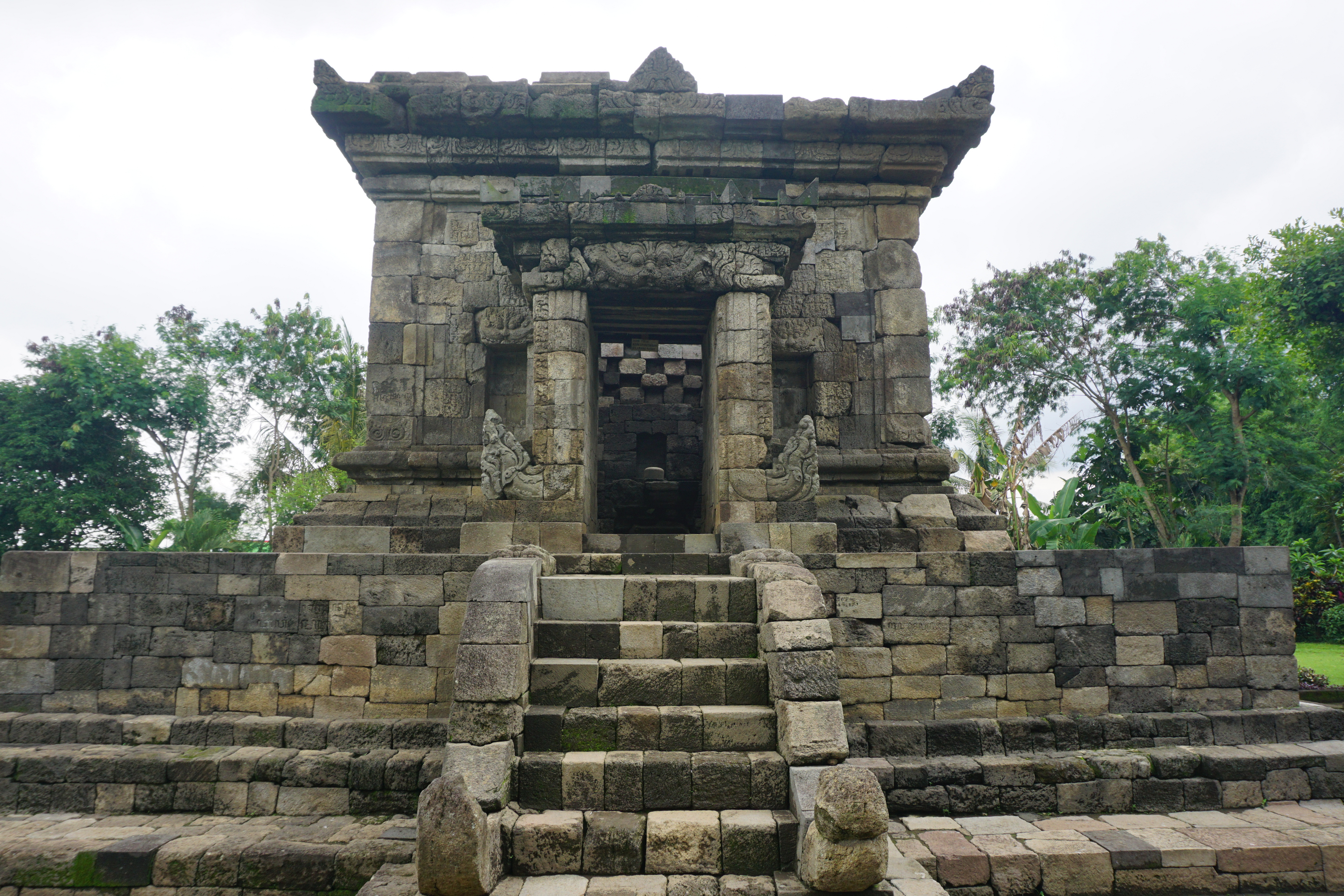
Badut temple, 8th century, Malang

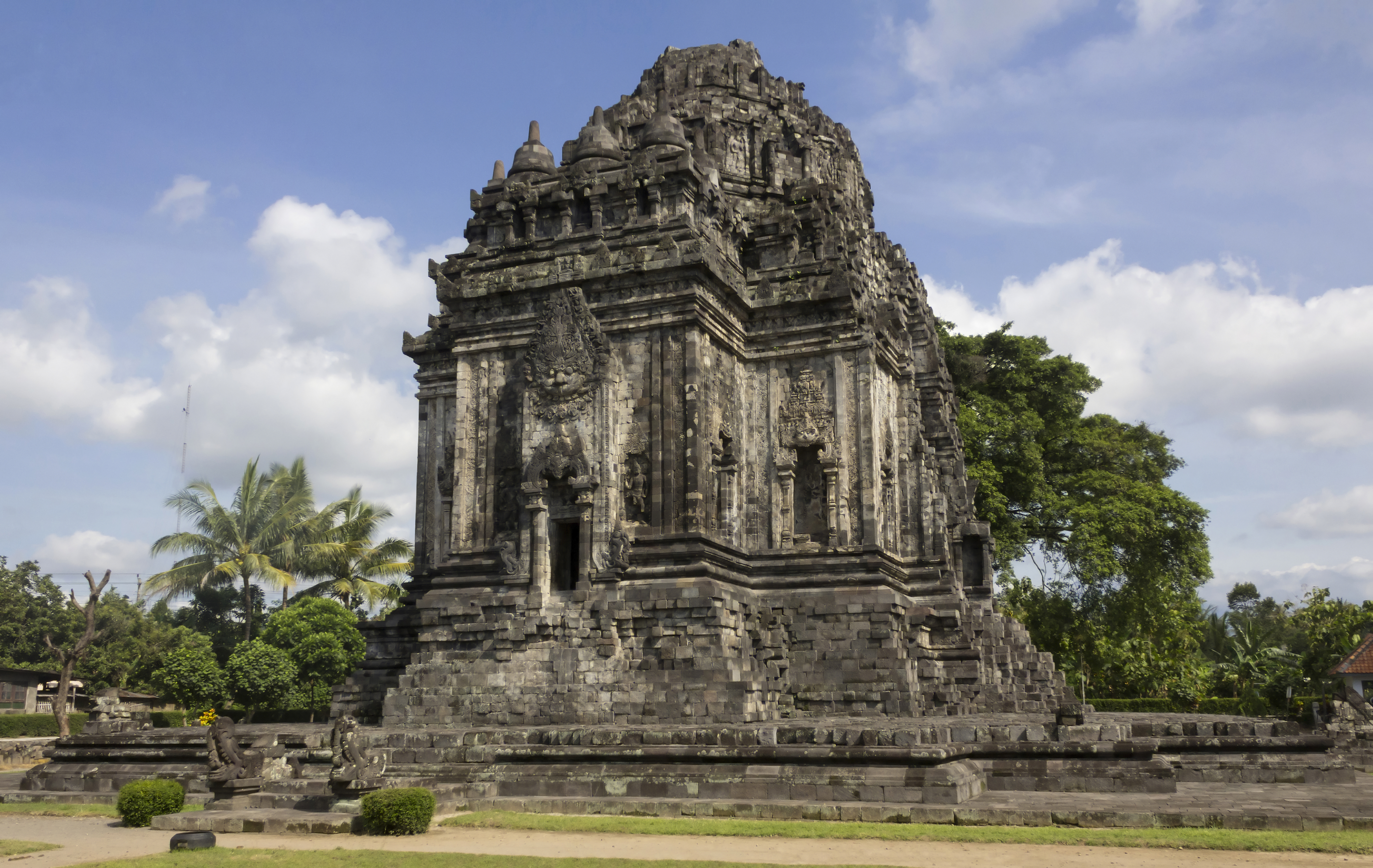
Kalasan temple, 8th century, near Prambanan

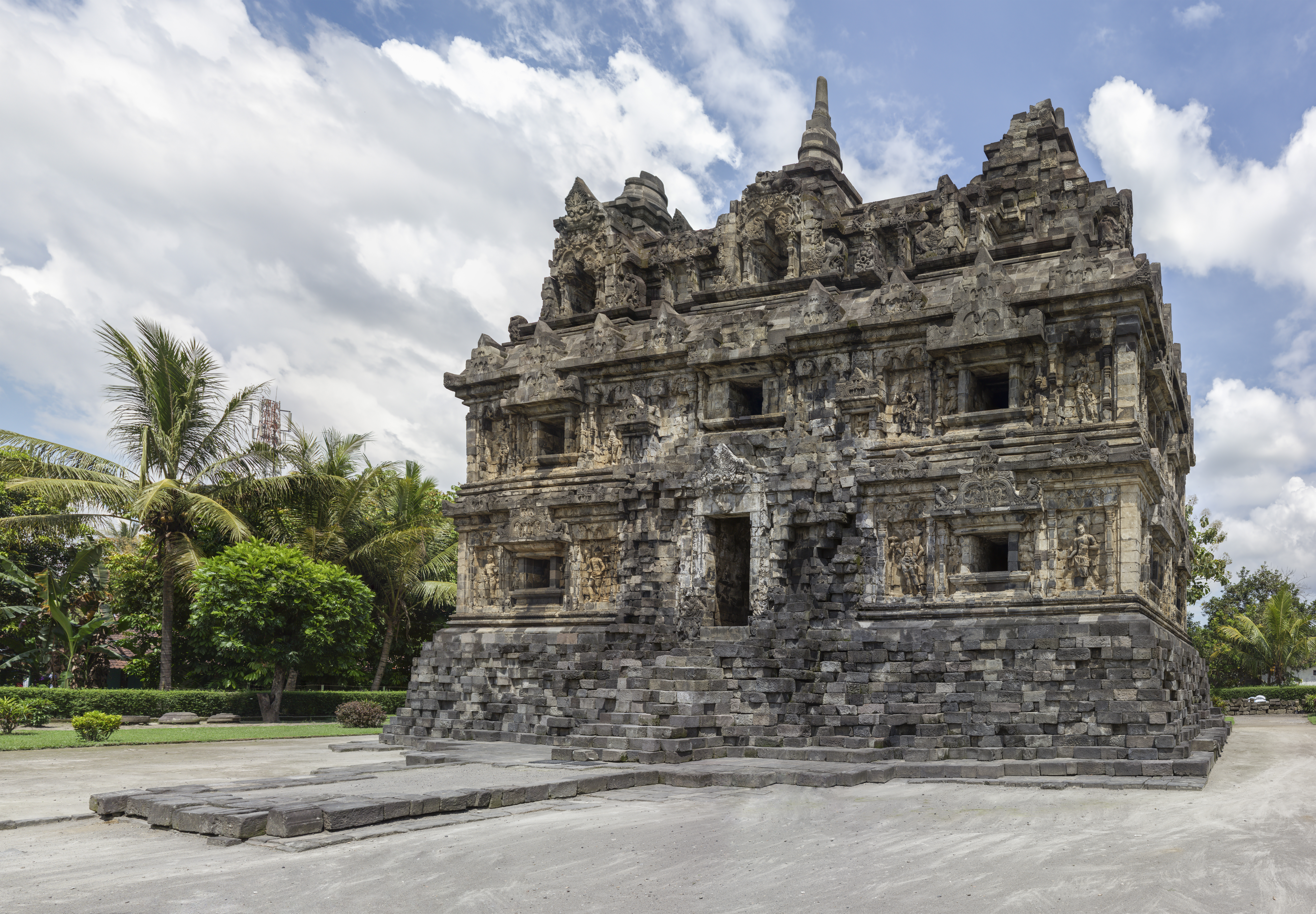
Sari temple, 8th century

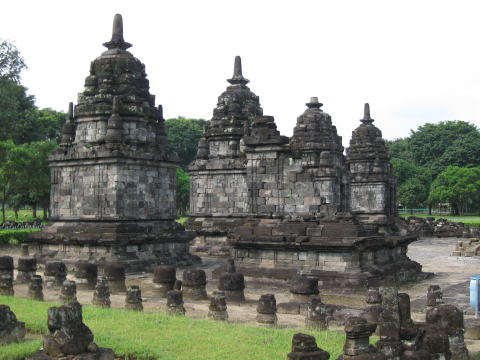
Lumbung, 8th century

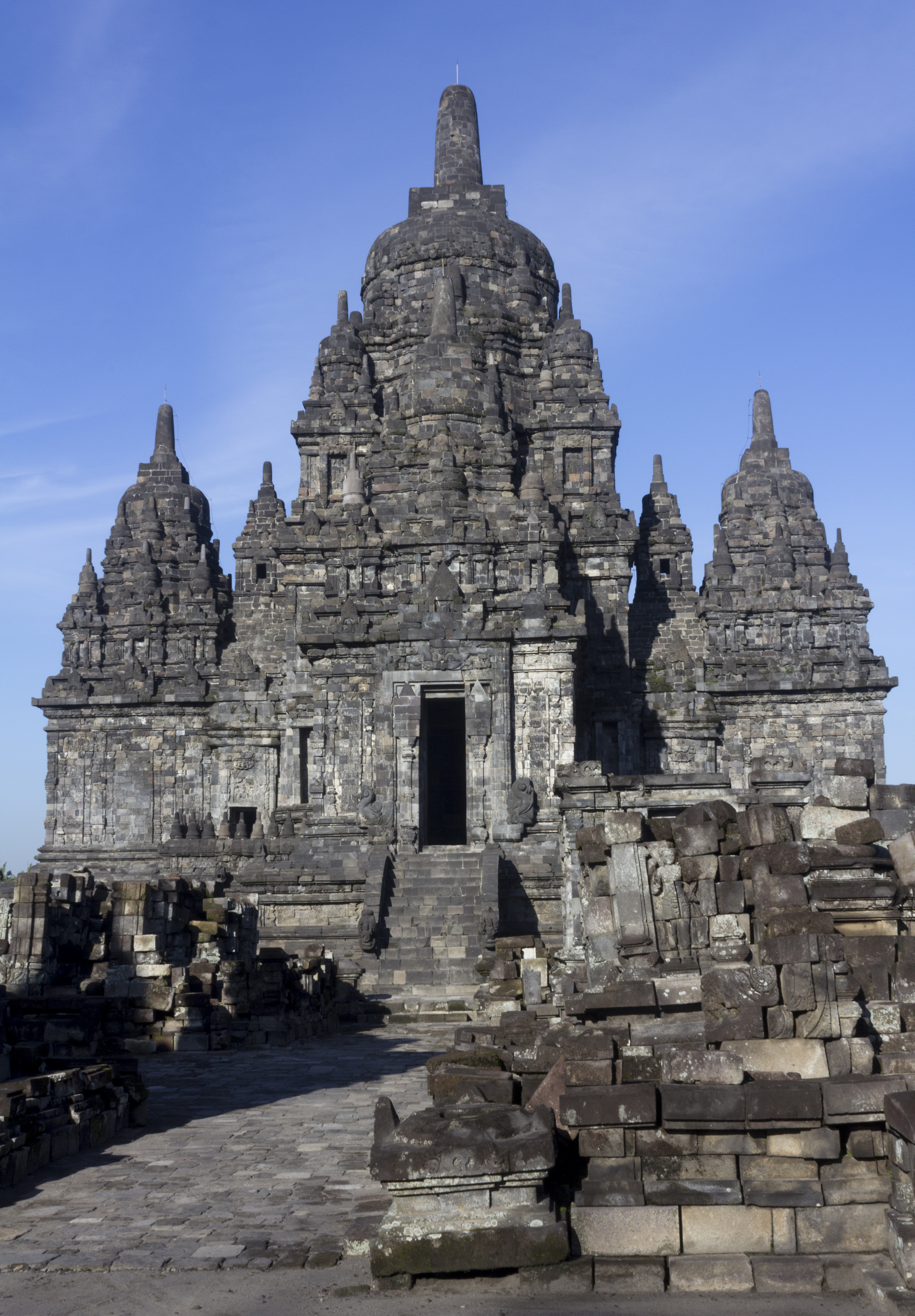
Sewu, 8th century, Central Java

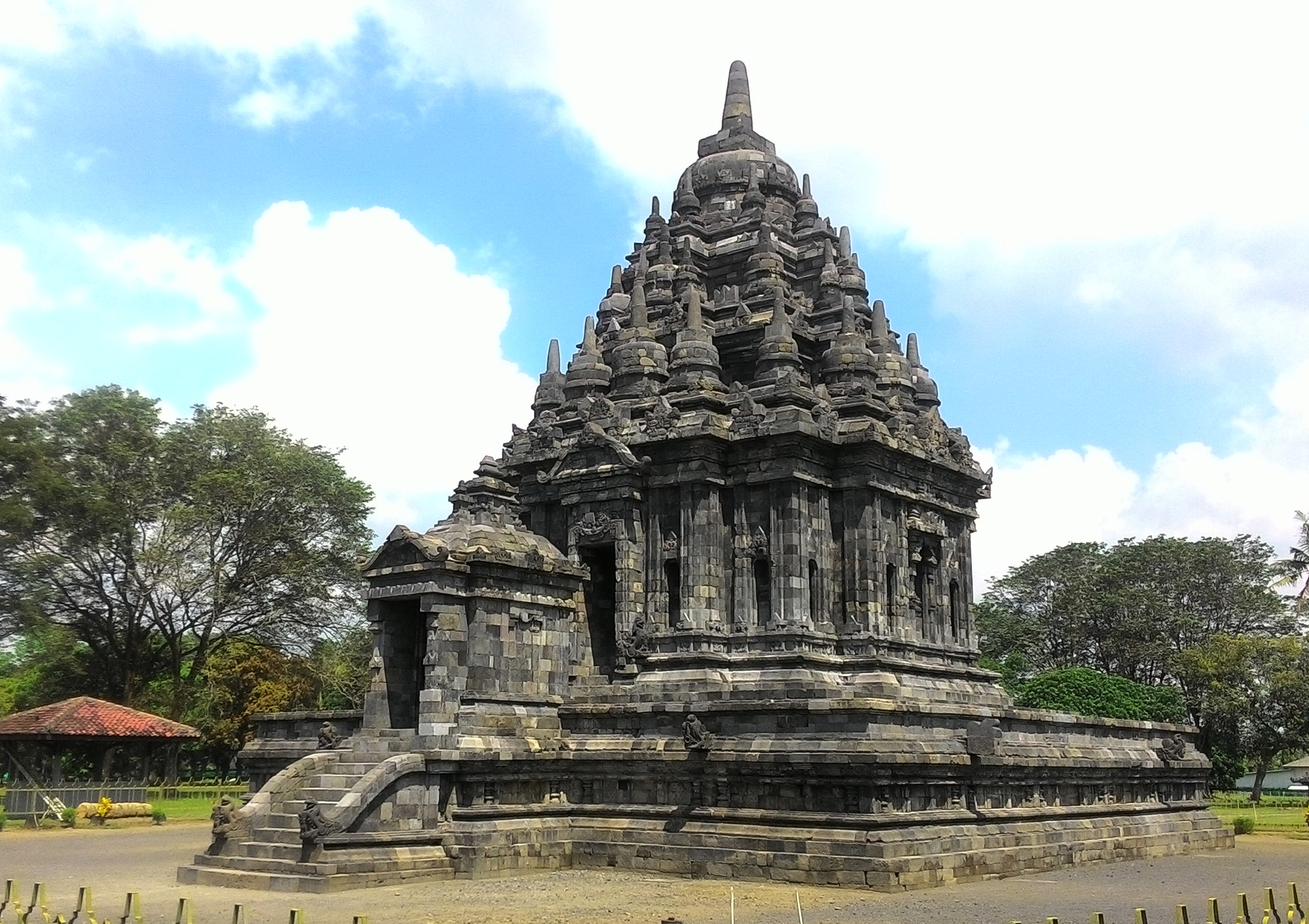
Bubrah, 8th century, part of Sewu Mandala

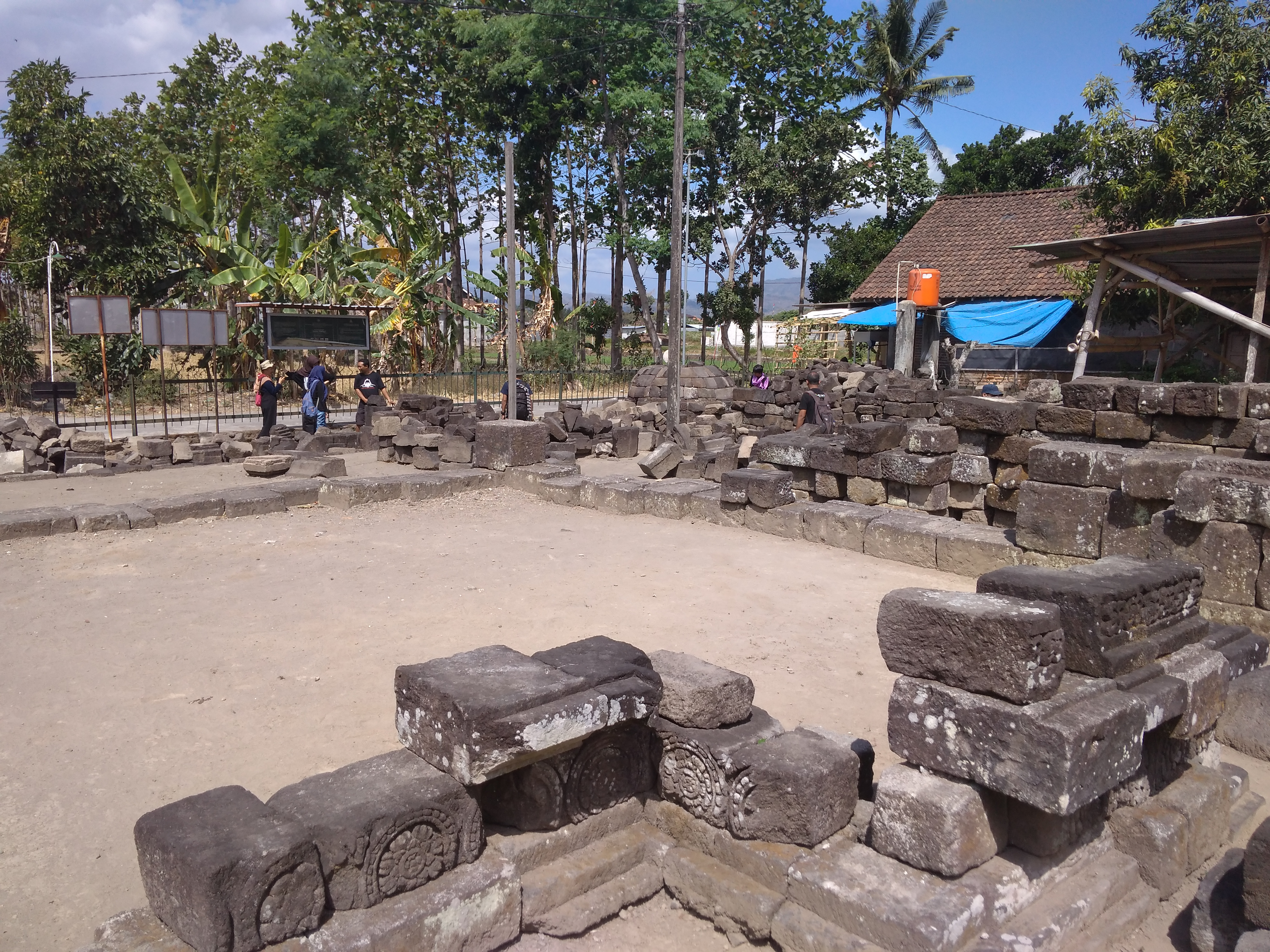
Gana temple, 8th century, part of Sewu Mandala

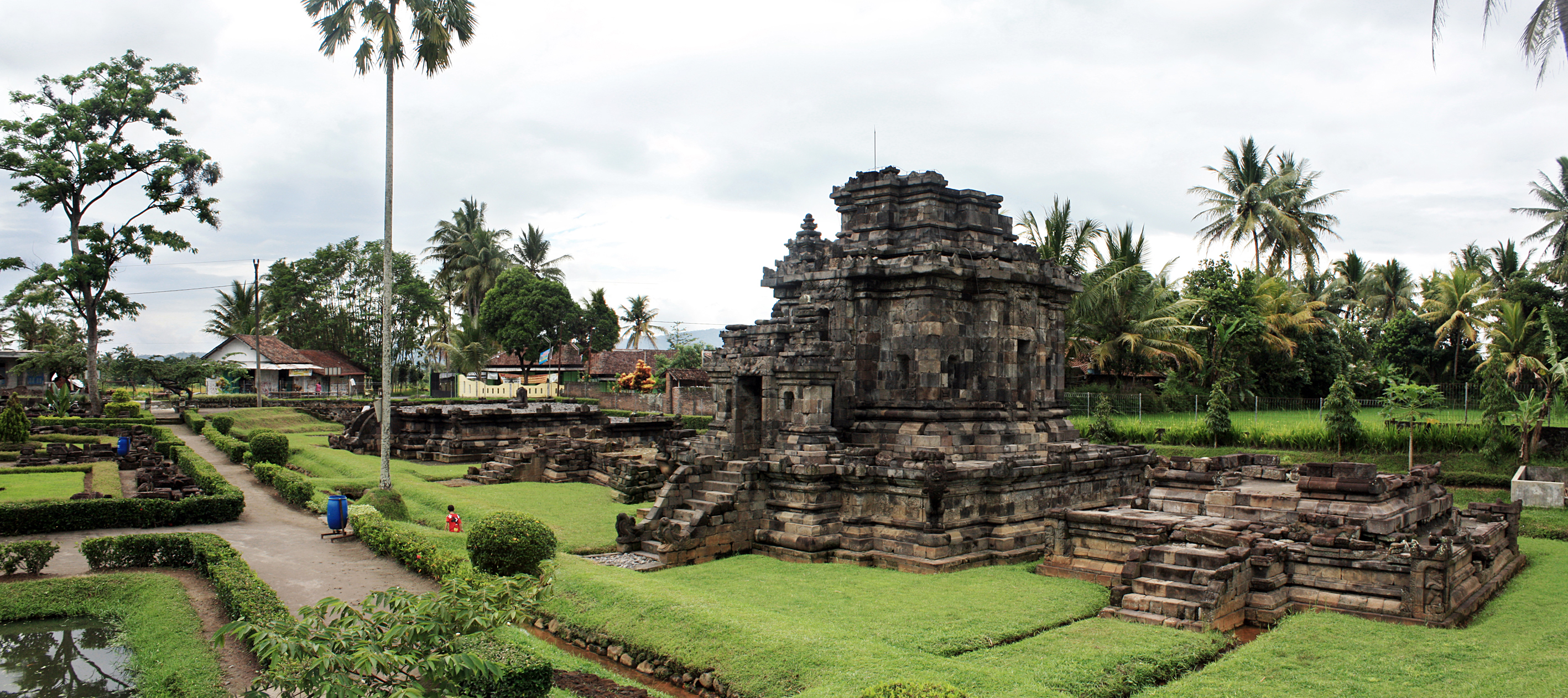
Ngawen temple, 8th century, Muntilan, Central Java

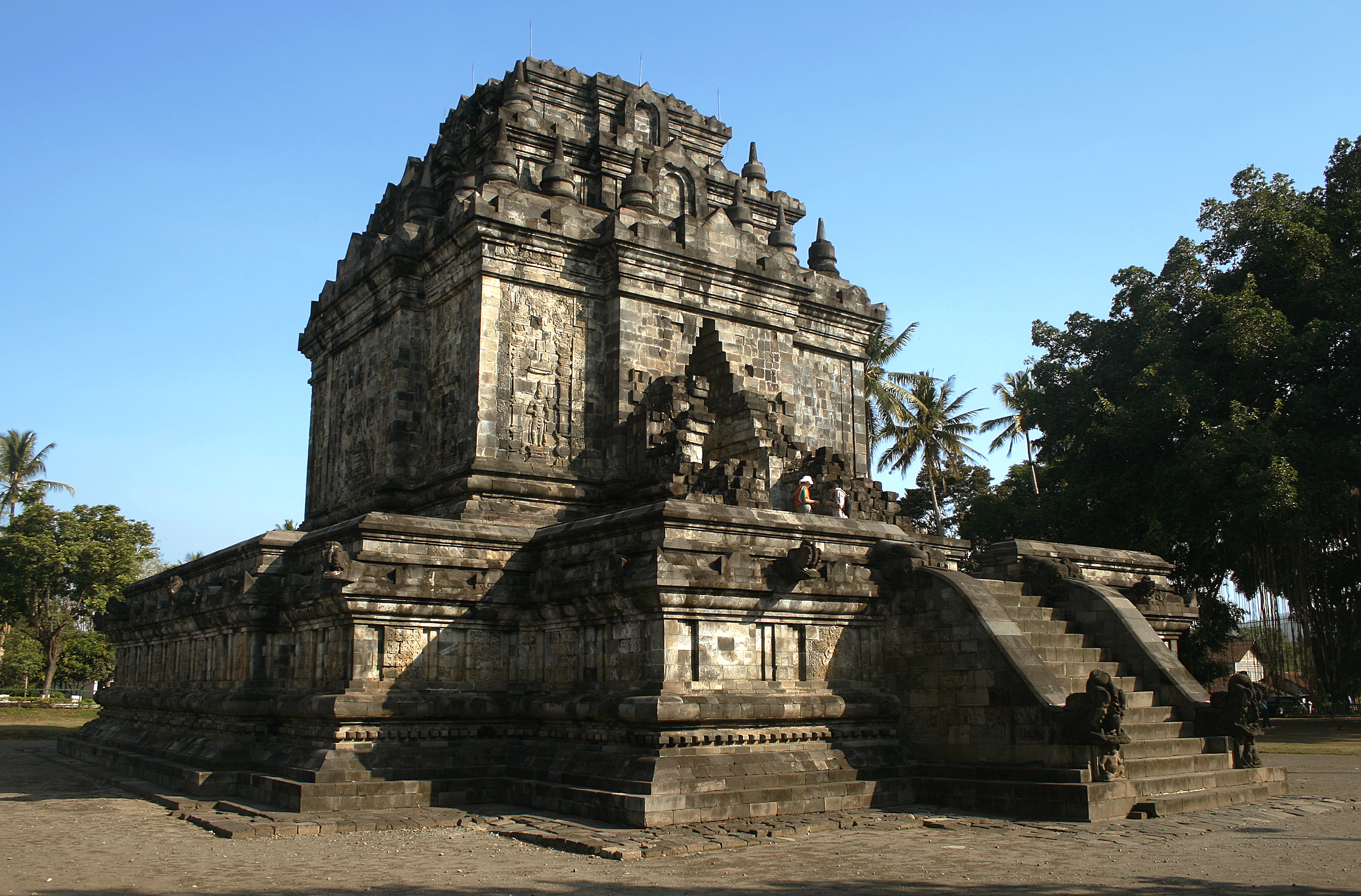
Mendut temple, 8th century, near Borobudur

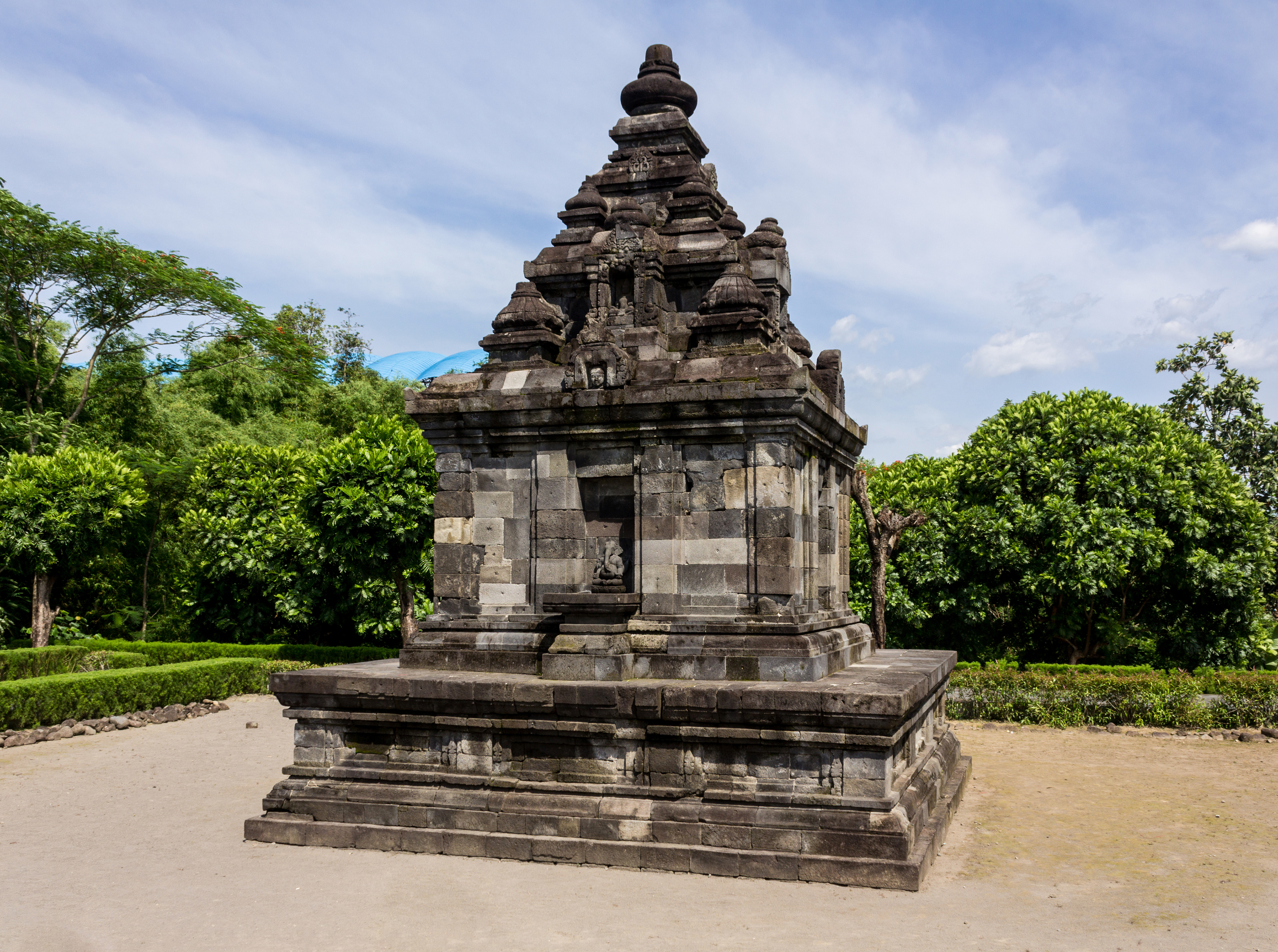
Candi Gebang, 8th–9th century, Yogyakarta

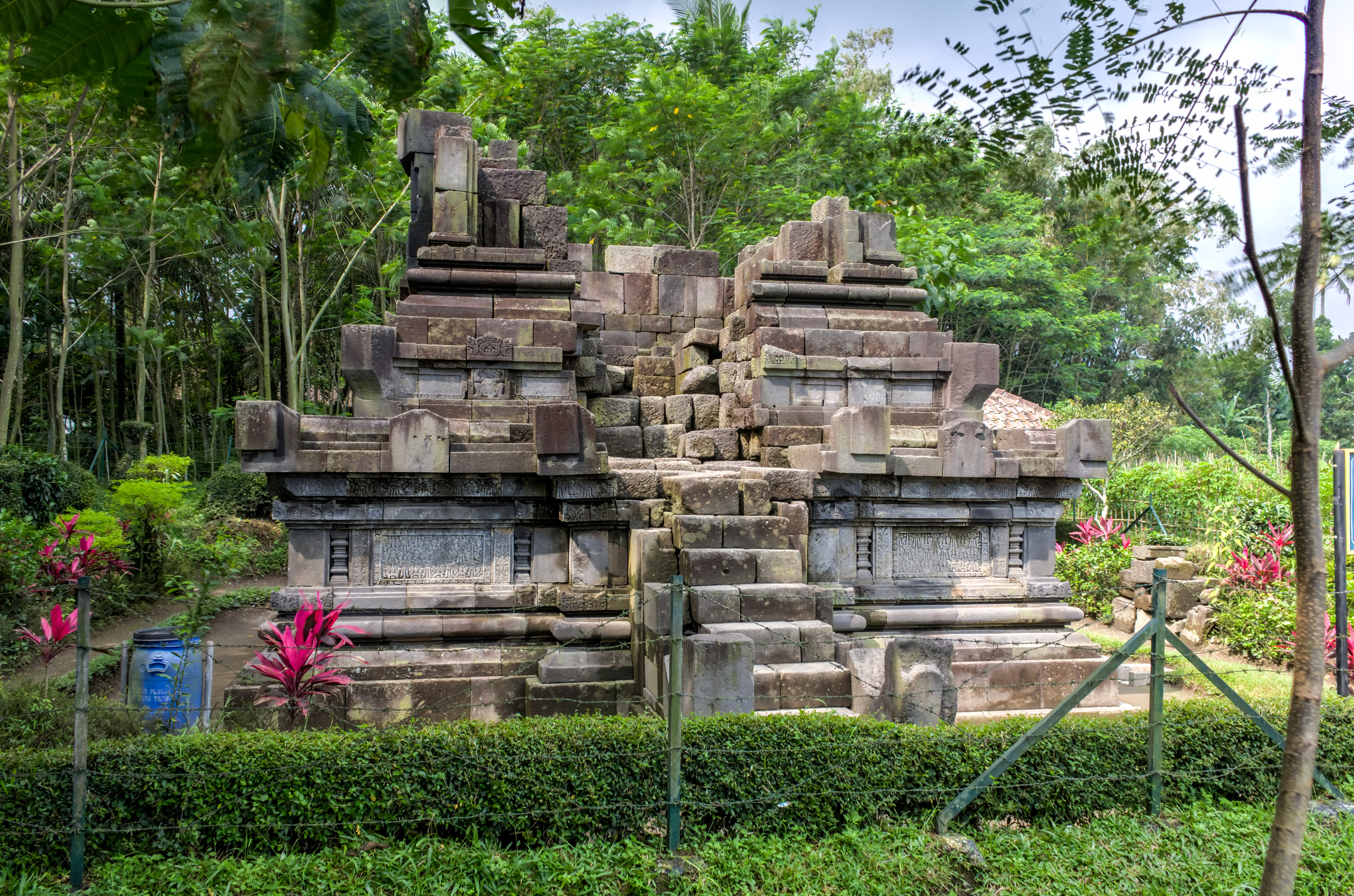
Asu Temple, 8th–9th century, Sengi, Magelang

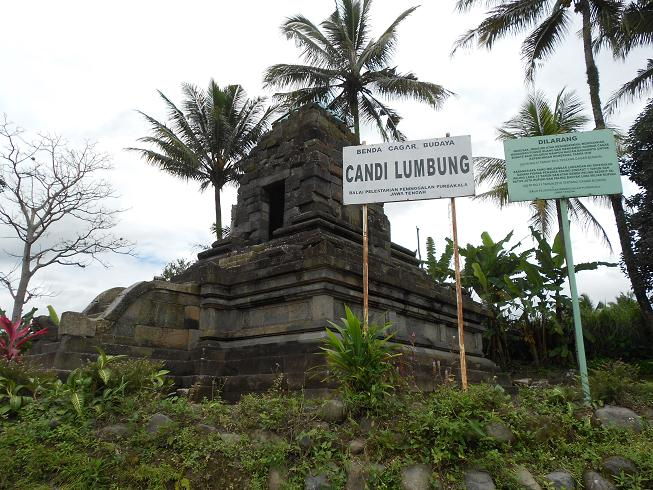
Lumbung Sengi temple, 8th–9th century, Sengi, Sawangan, Magelang

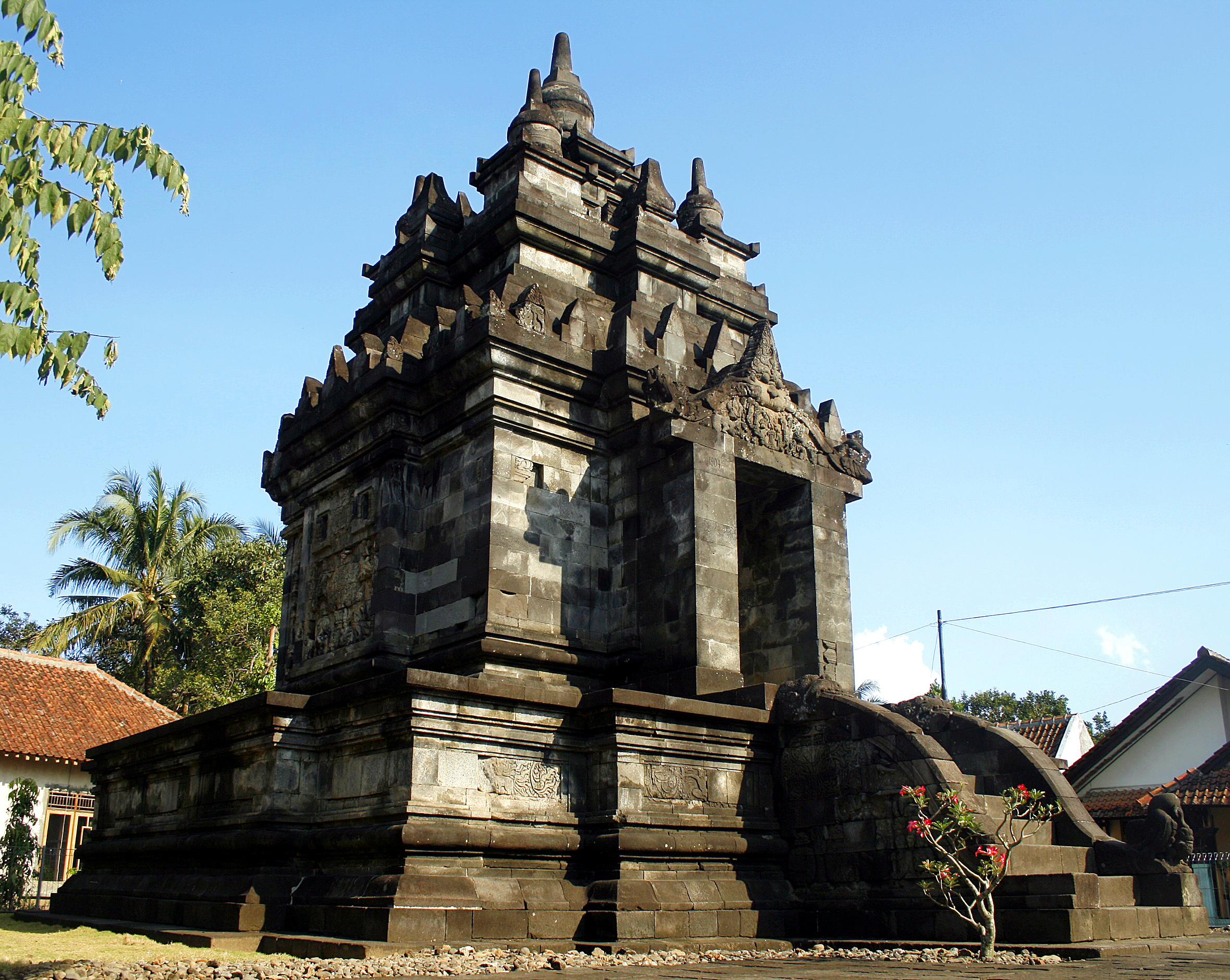
Pawon temple, 9th century, between Borobudur and Mendut

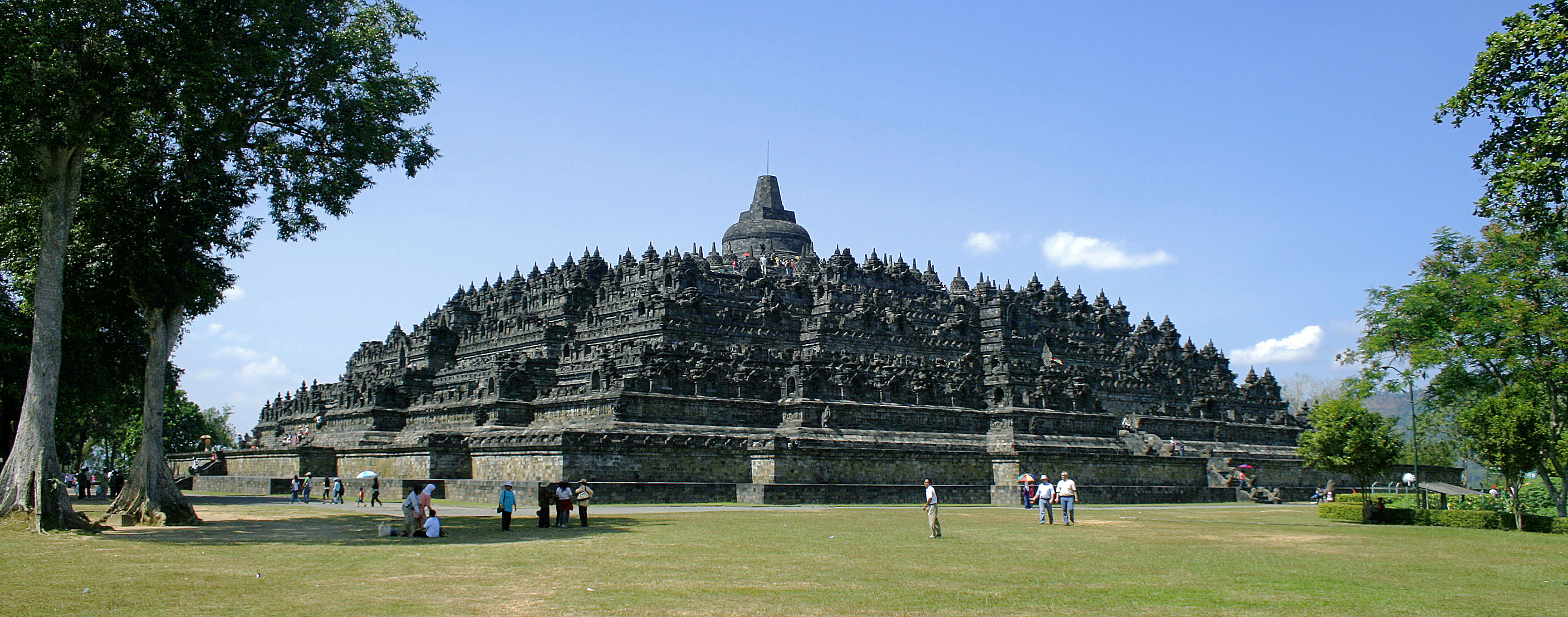
Borobudur, 9th century, Magelang, Central Java, world's largest Buddhist monument

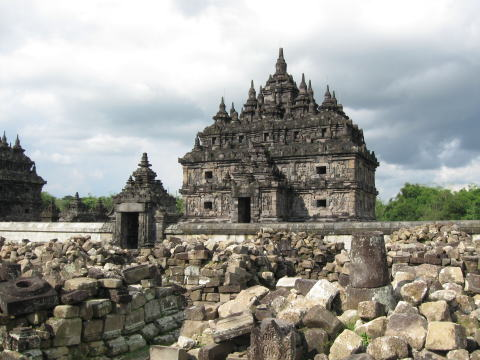
Plaosan, 9th century

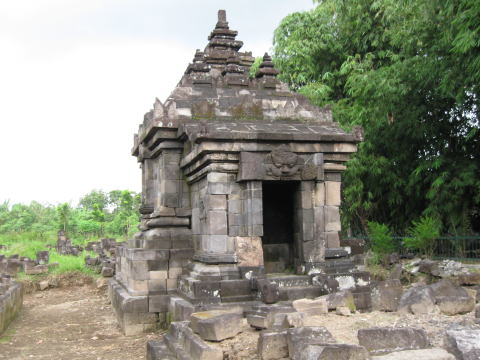
Plaosan Kidul, 9th century

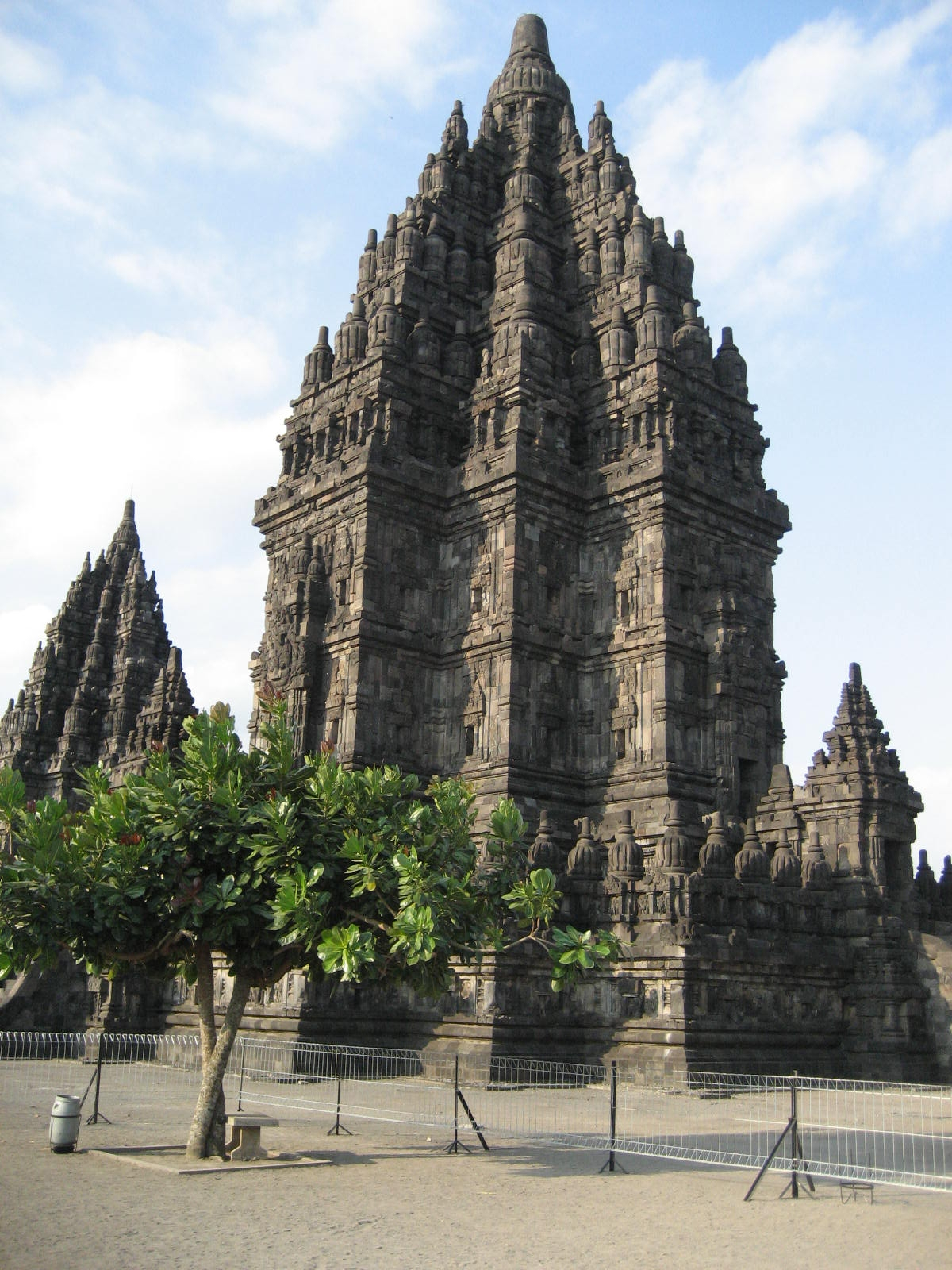
Prambanan, 9th century, the largest Hindu Temple in Indonesia

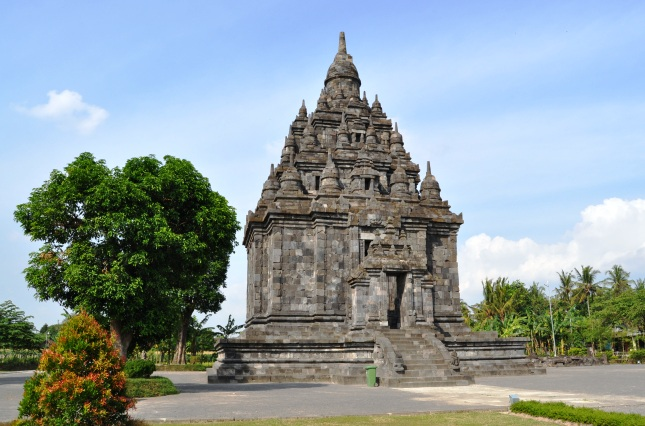
Sojiwan, 9th century, near Prambanan

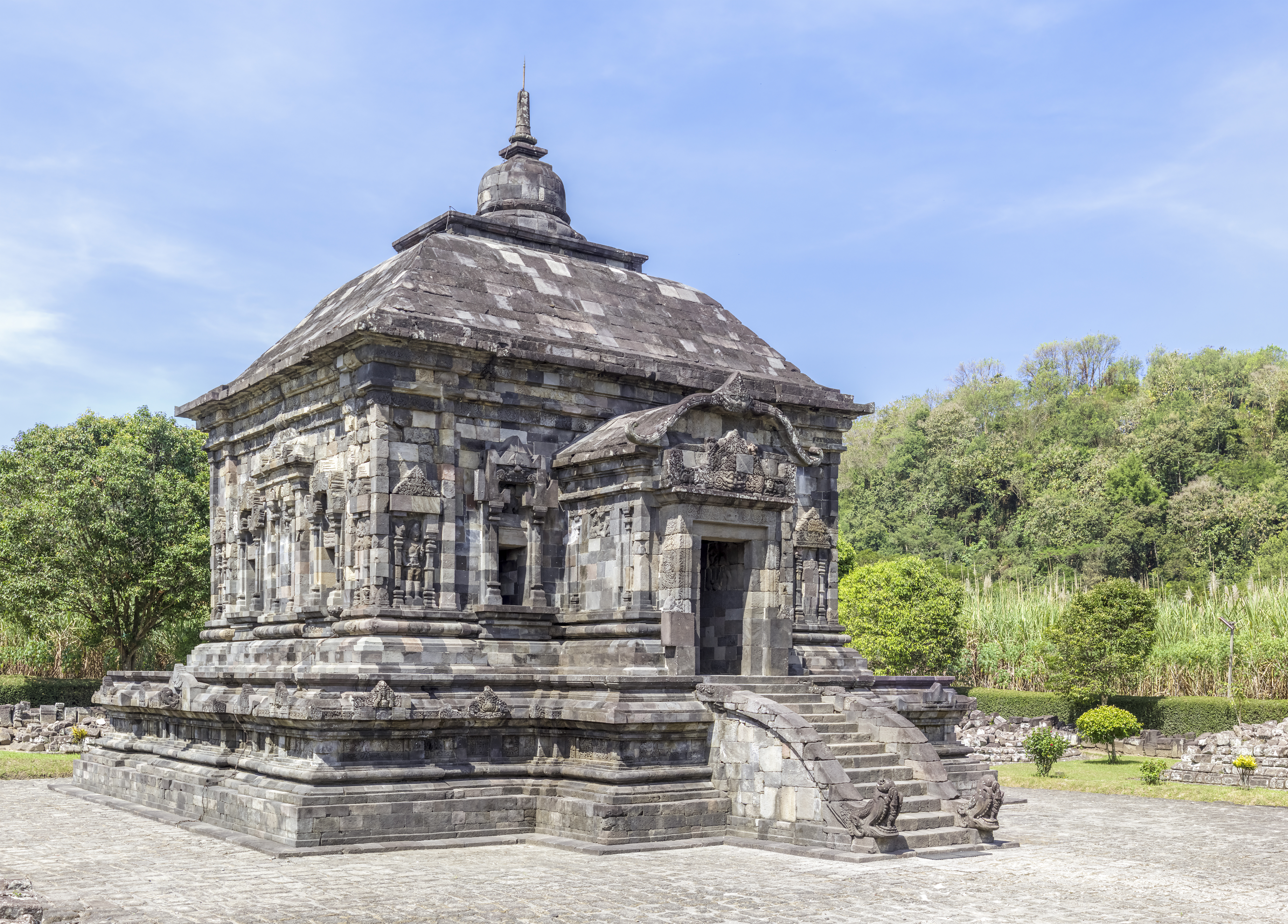
Banyunibo, 9th century

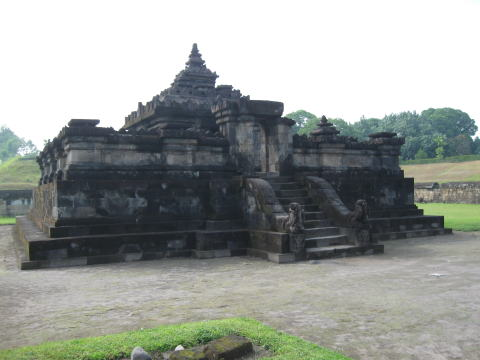
Sambisari, 9th century

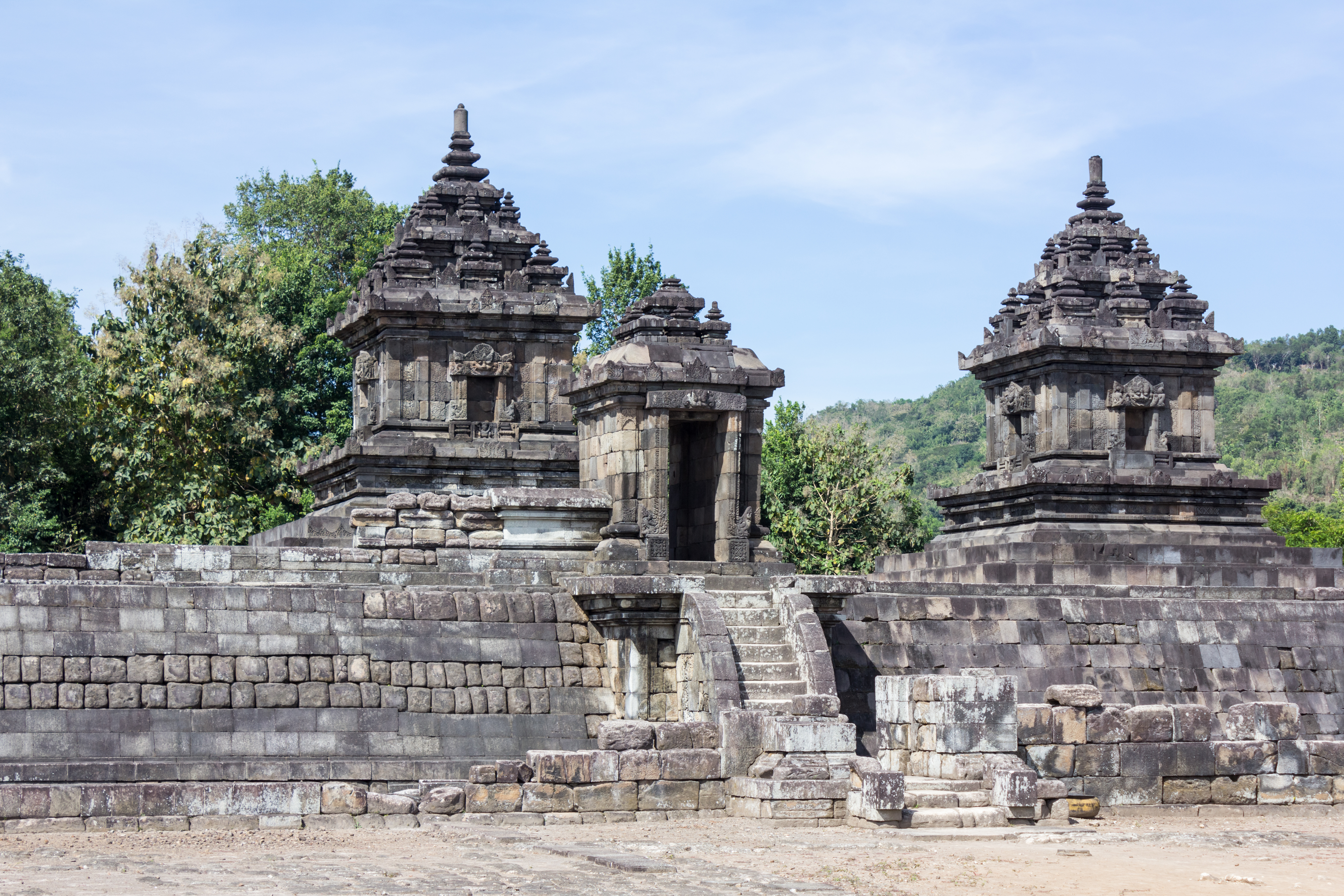
Barong temple, 9th century

Kimpulan, 9th–10th century, Kaliurang, Yogyakarta

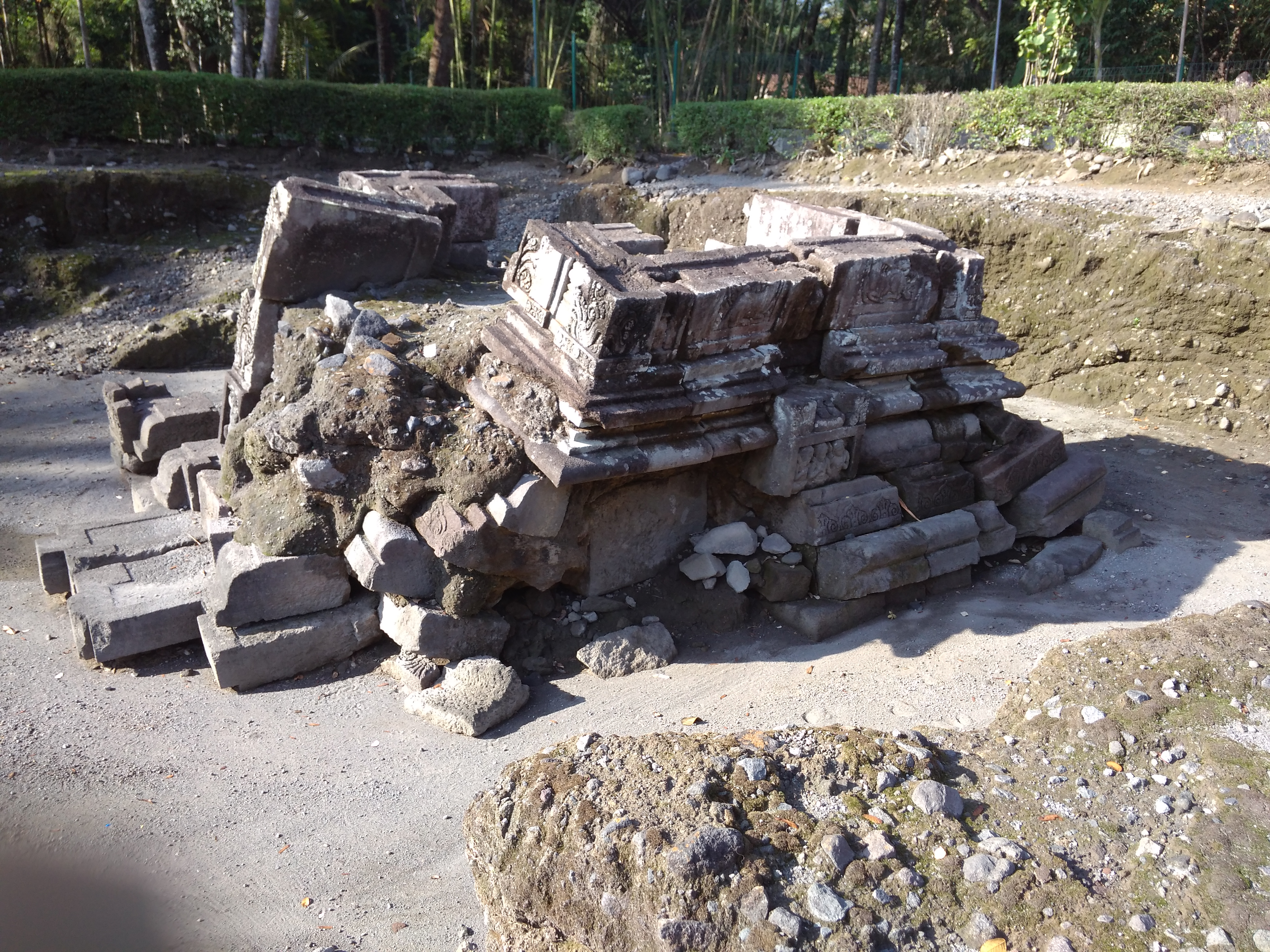
Morangan temple, 9th–10th century, Ngemplak, Sleman, Yogyakarta

Merak temple, 10th century, Klaten, Central Java

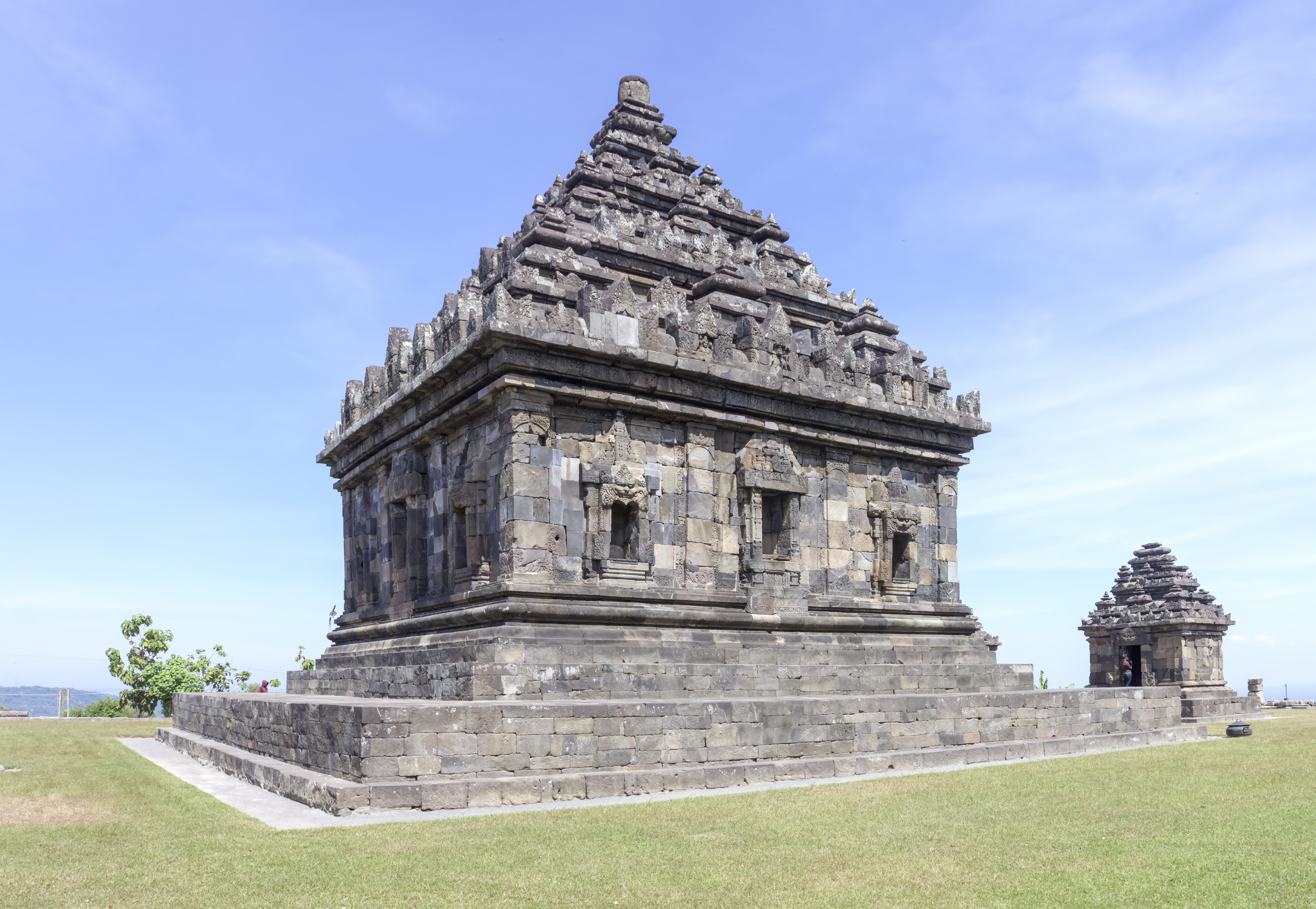
Ijo Temple, 10th–11th century, Yogyakarta

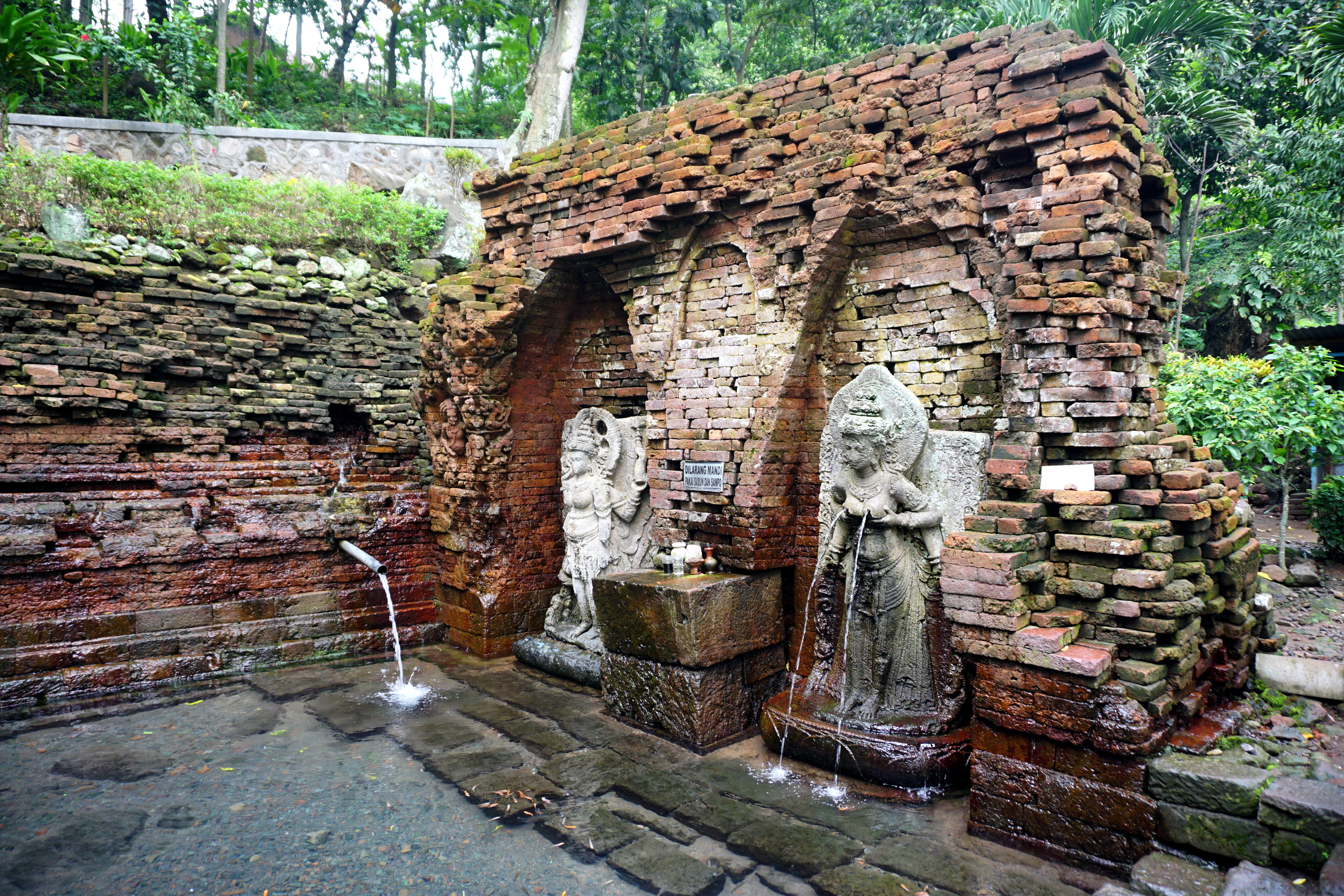
Belahan temple, fountain and pool, 11th century, Mount Penanggungan, Gempol, Pasuruan, East Java

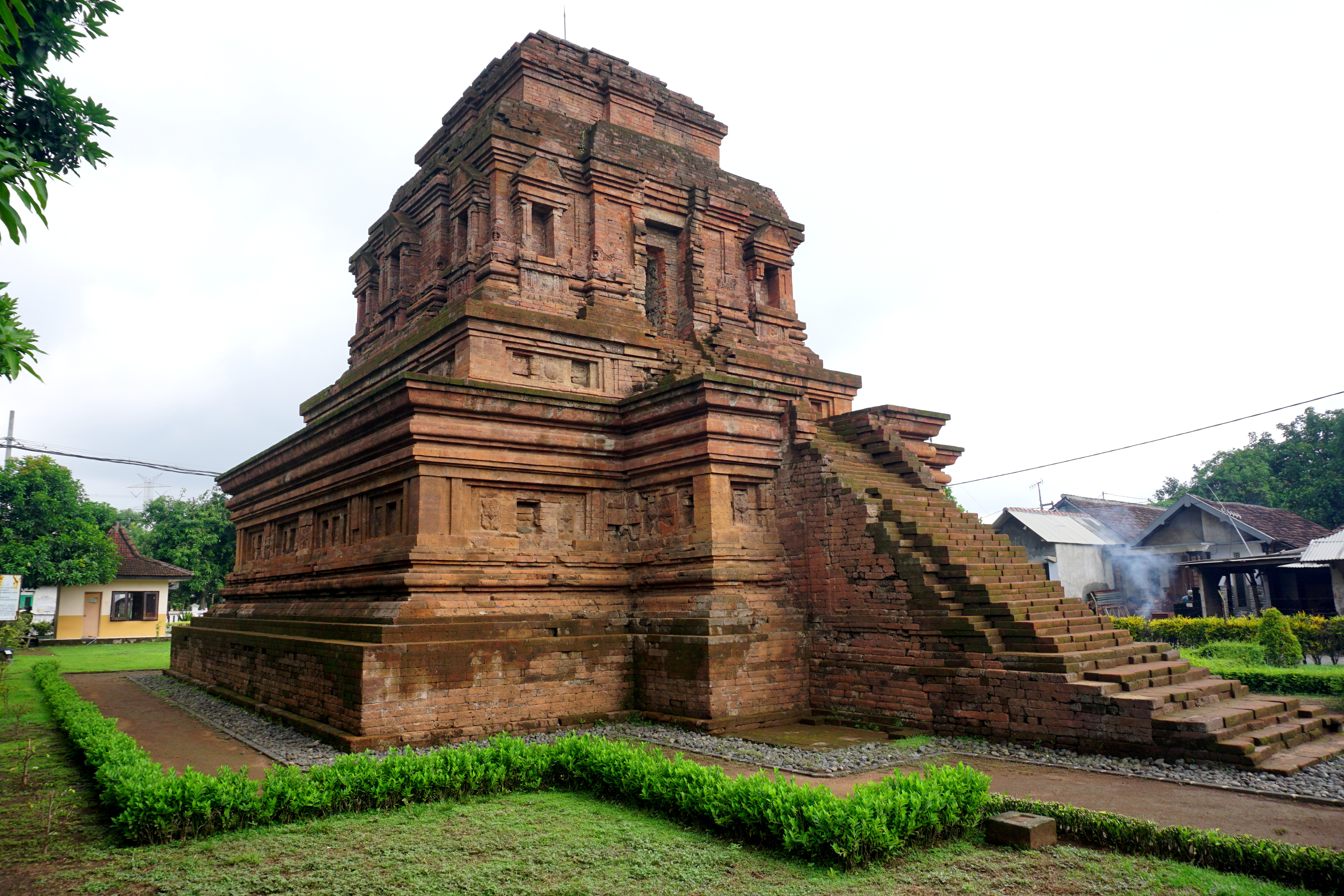
Candi Gunung Gangsir, 11th century, Pasuruan, East Java

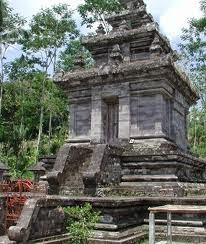
Candi Mengening, 11th century, Tampaksiring, Bali

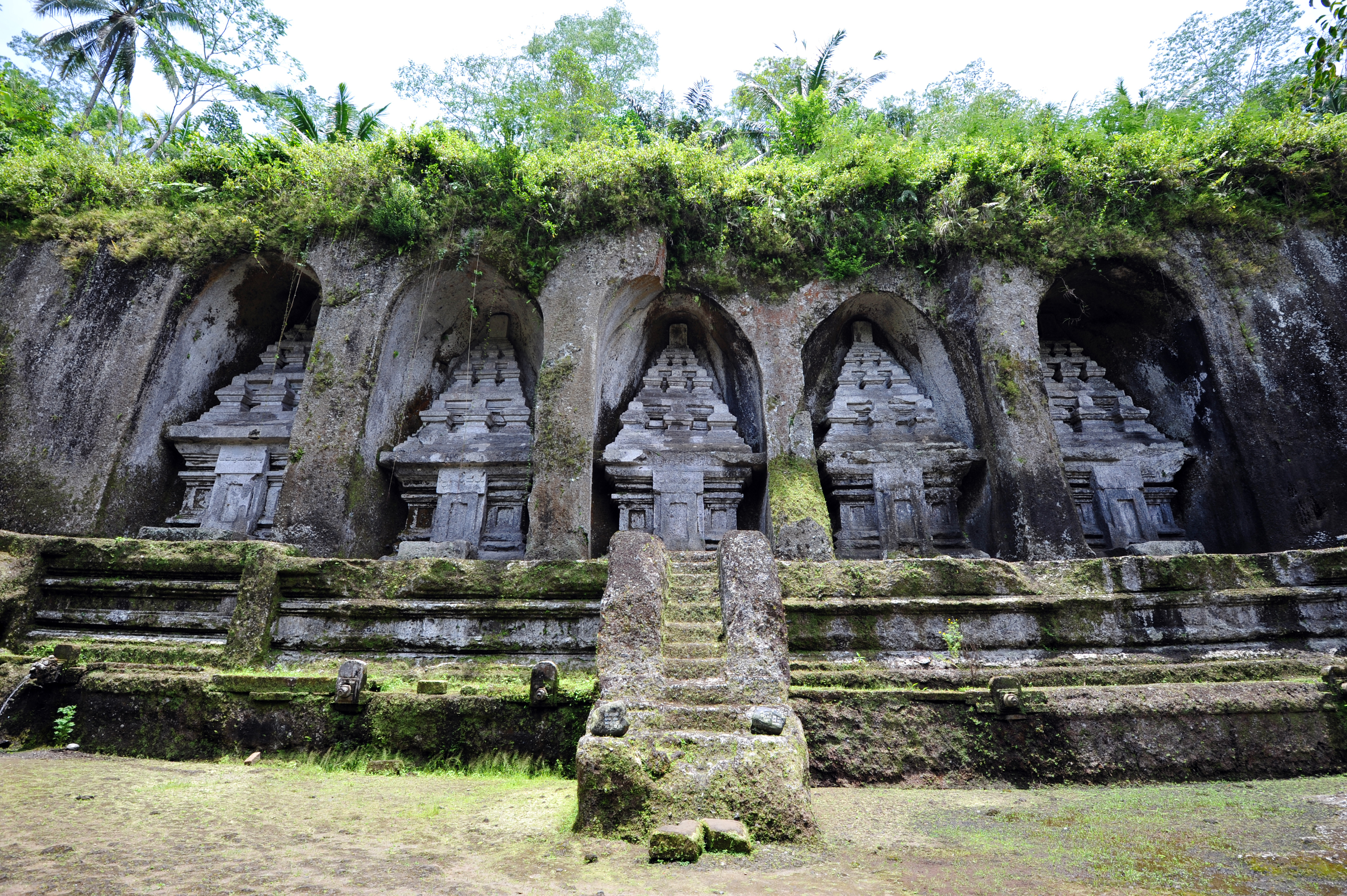
Gunung Kawi, 11th century, Tampak Siring, Bali

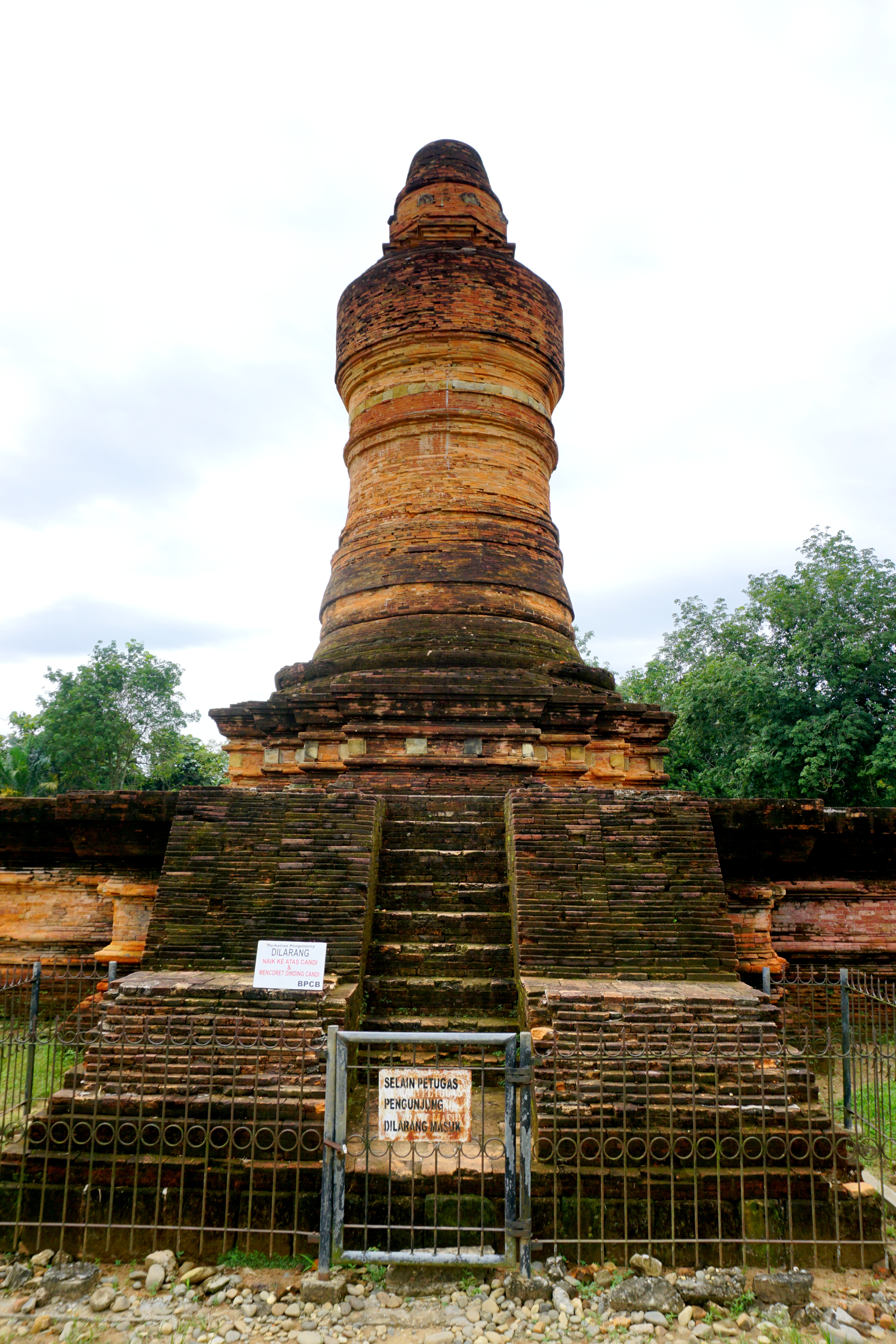
Muara Takus, 11th–12th century, Riau

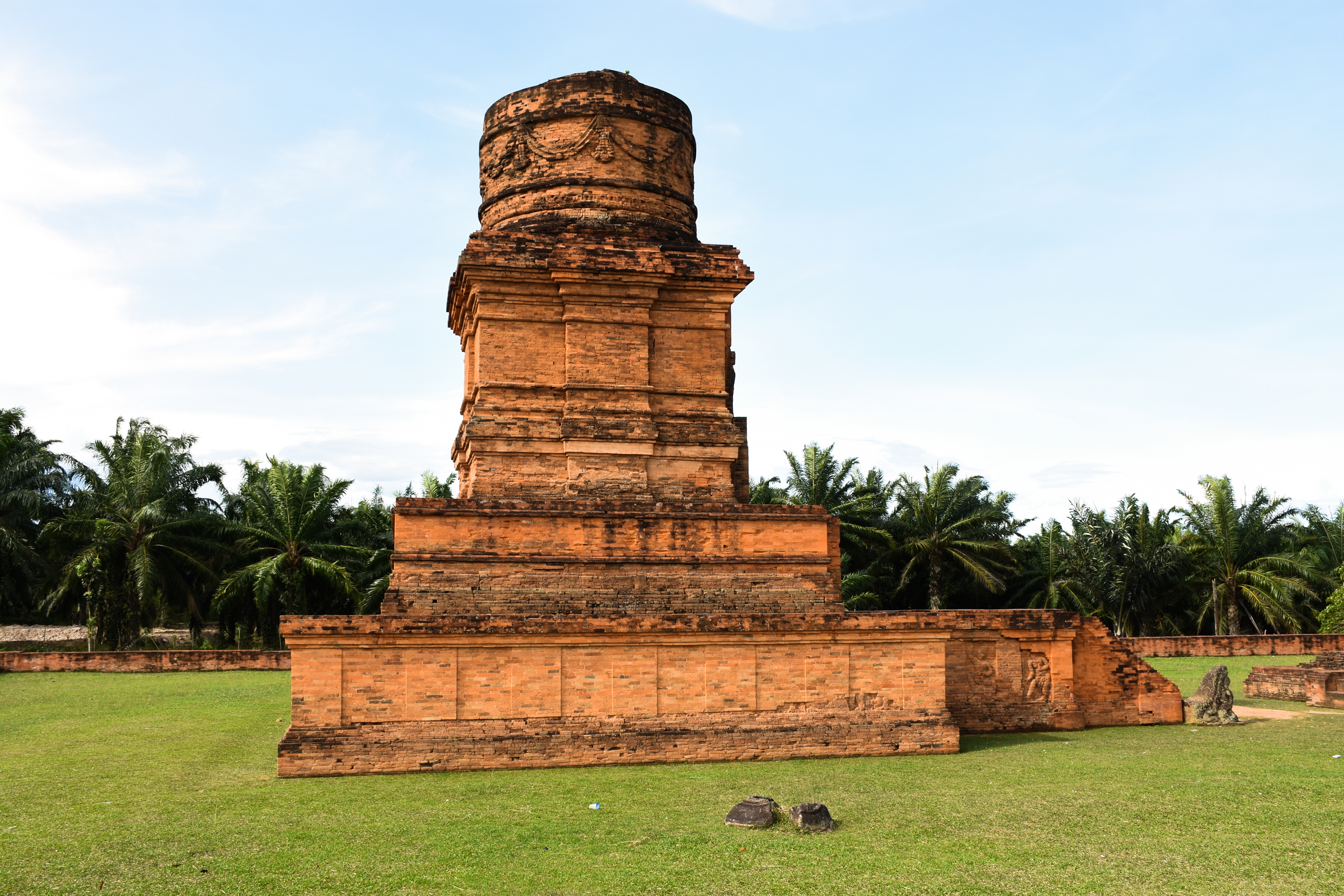
Bahal temple, 11th–13th century, North Sumatra

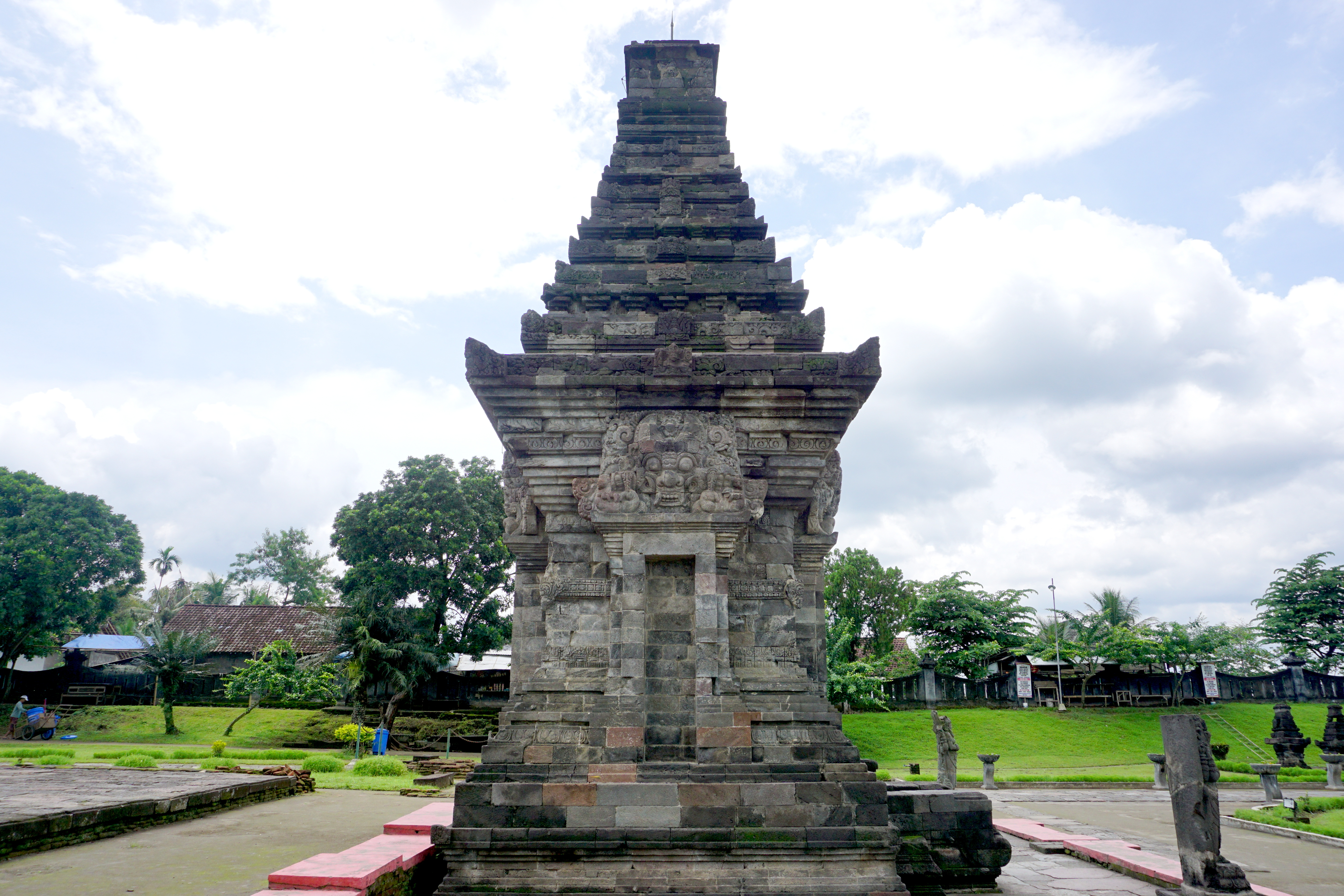
Penataran, 12th–15th century, Blitar

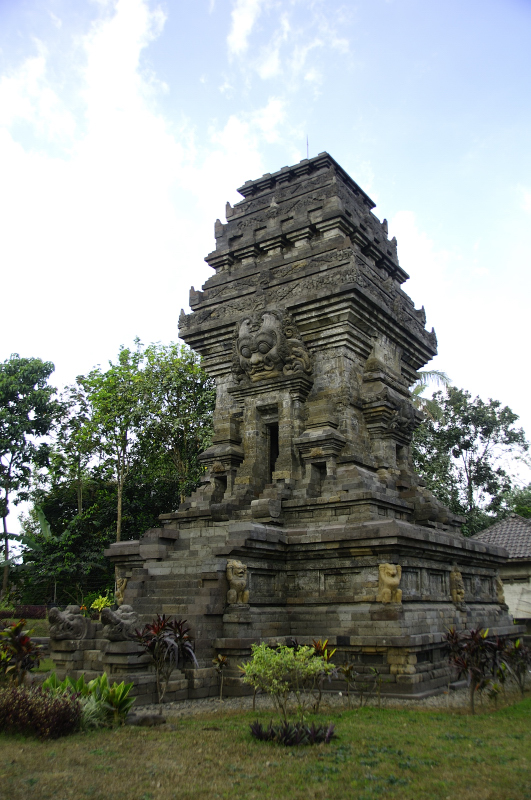
Kidal, 13th century, Malang

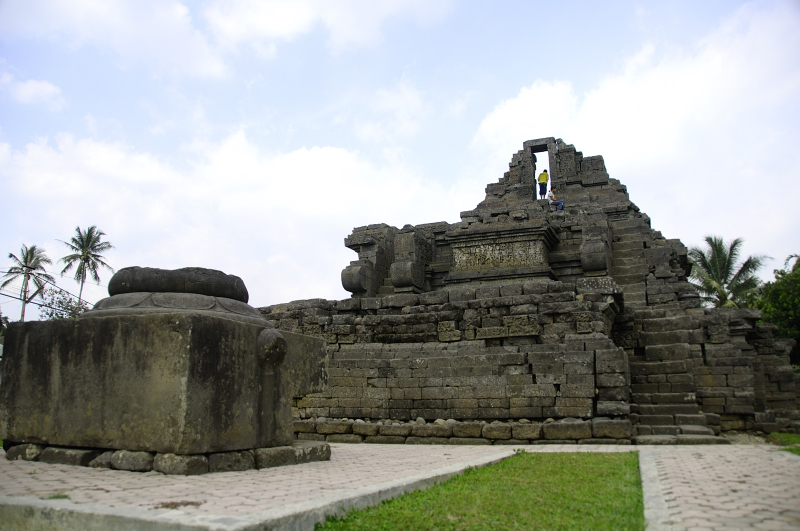
Jago, 13th century, Malang

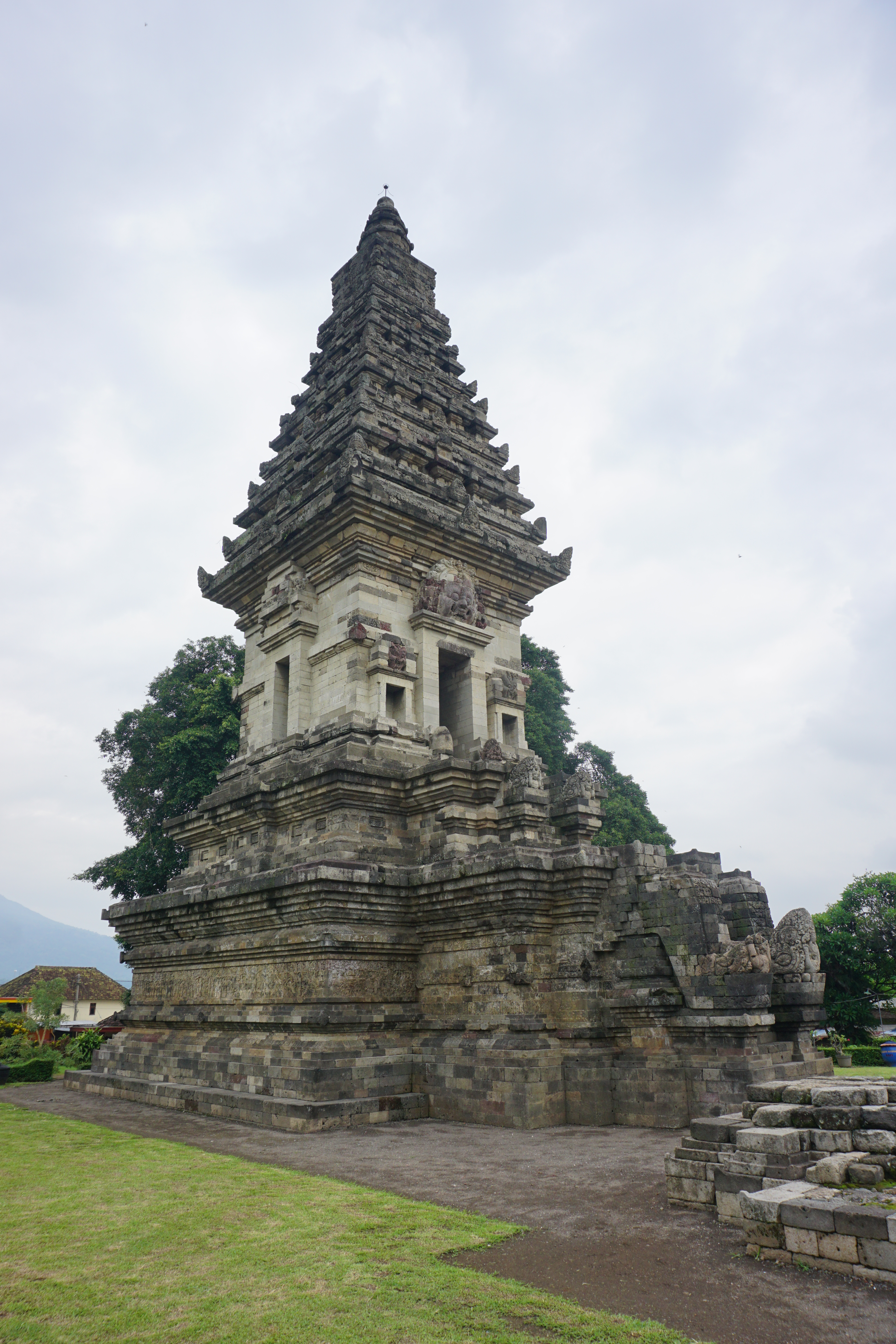
Jawi, 13th century, Prigen, Pasuruan

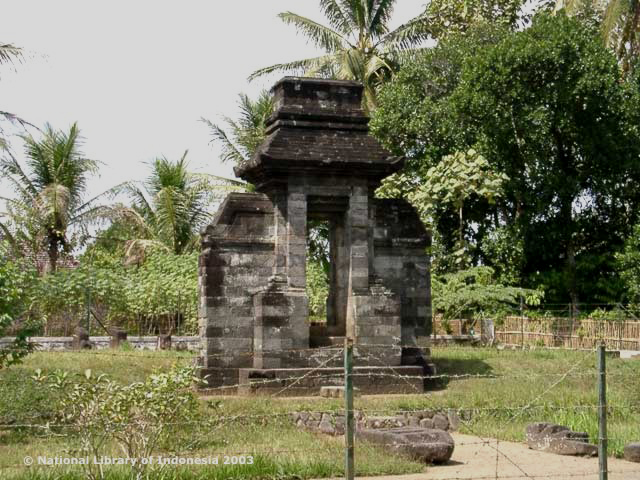
Candi Plumbangan, 14th century, Blitar, East Java

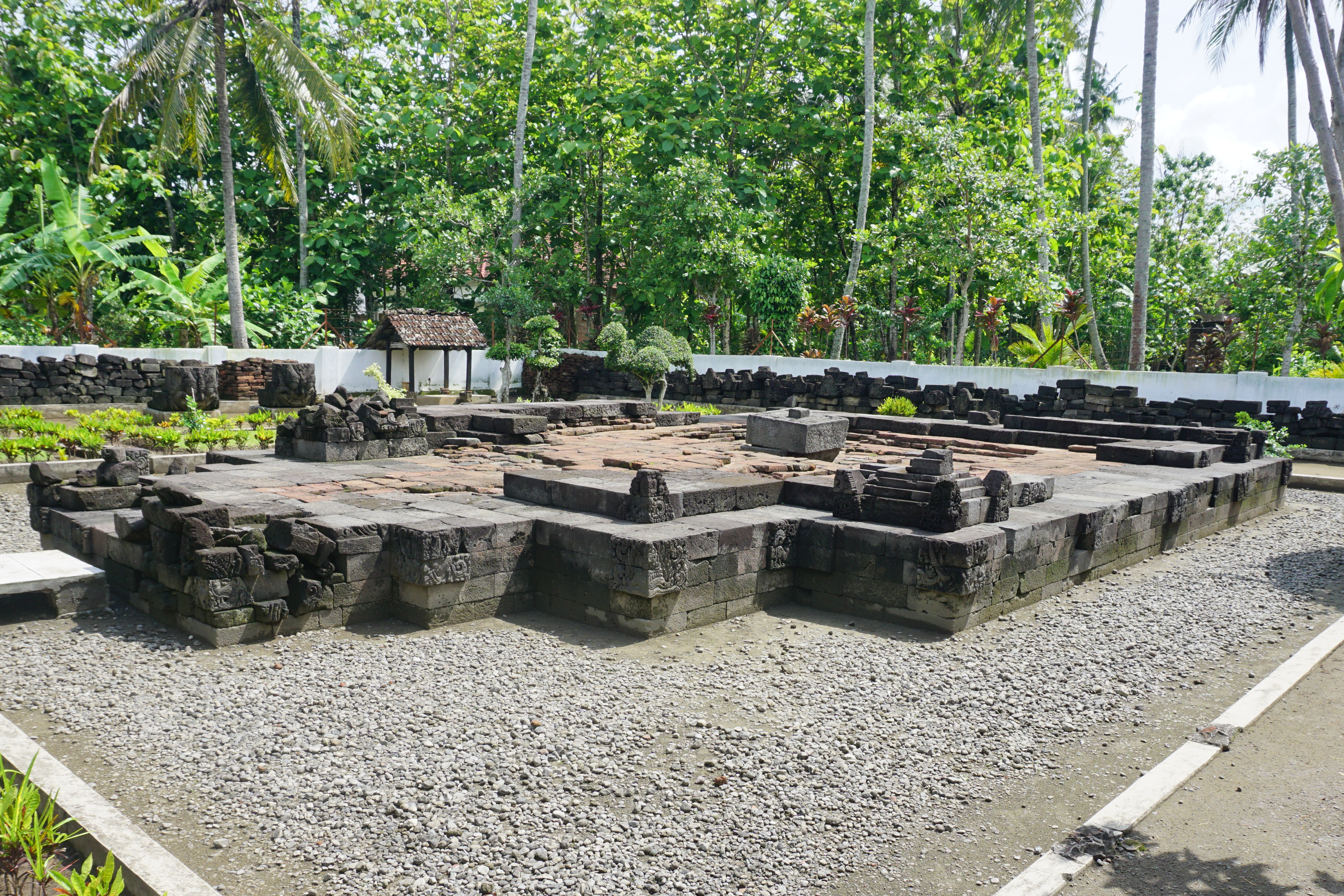
Simping temple, 14th century, Sumberjati, Blitar, East Java

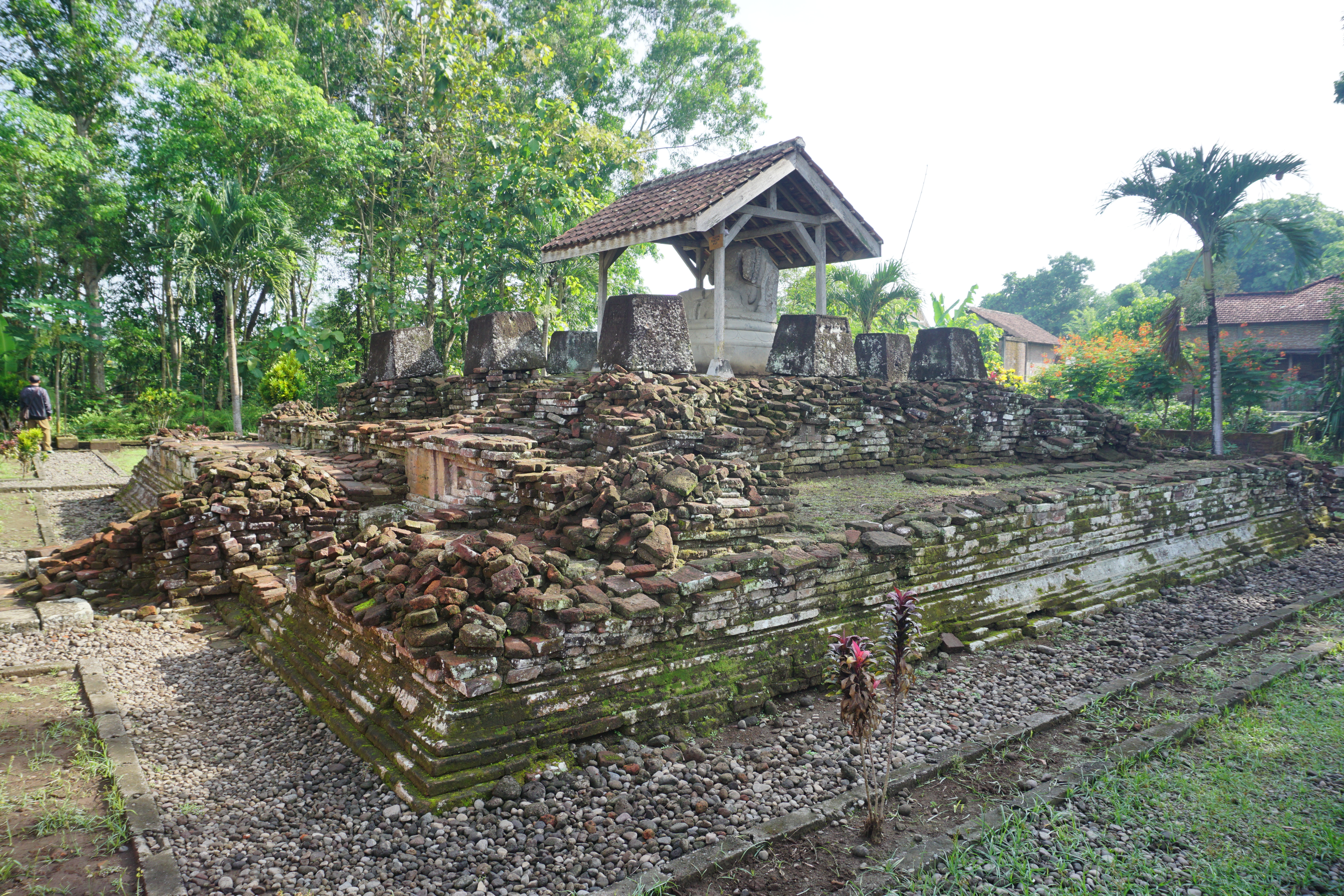
Candi Gayatri, 14th century, Boyolangu, Tulungagung, East Java

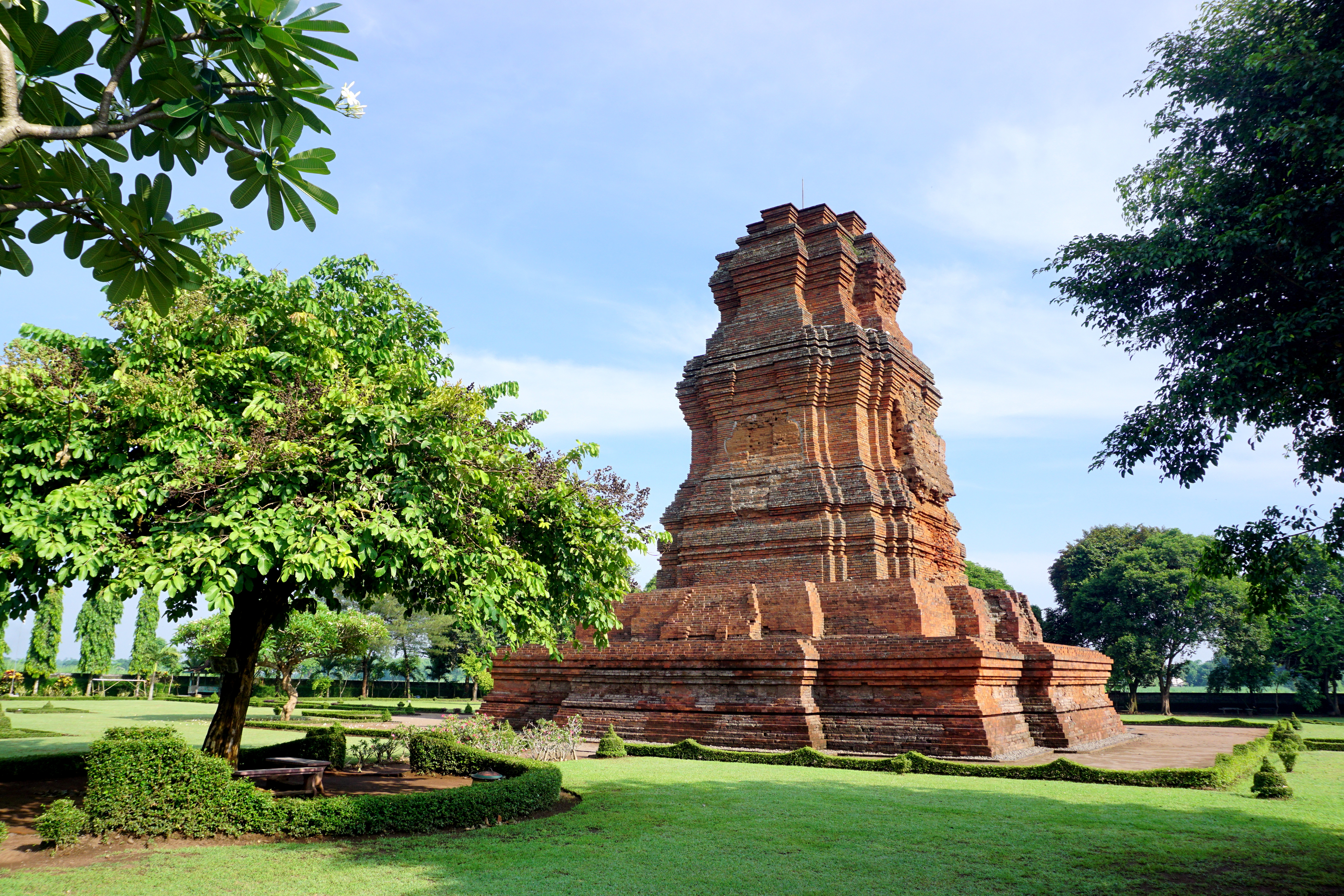
Brahu, Trowulan, 14th century

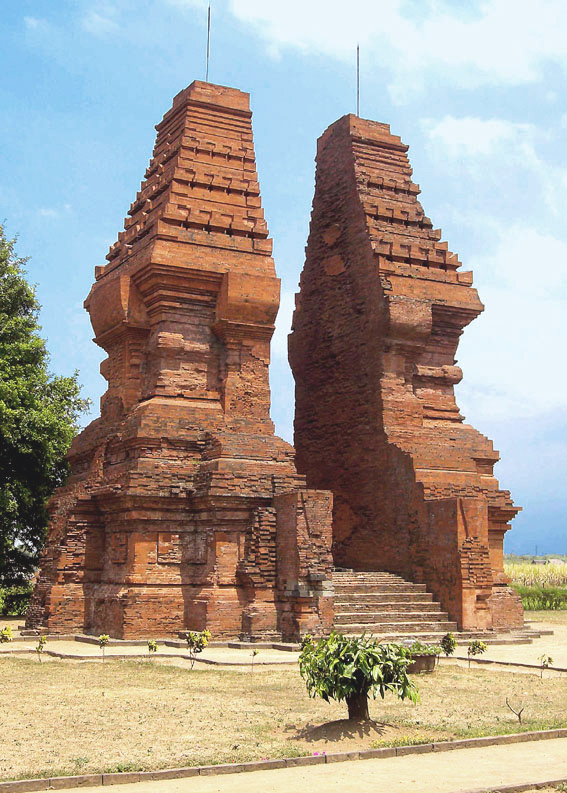
Candi Wringin Lawang, Trowulan, 14th century

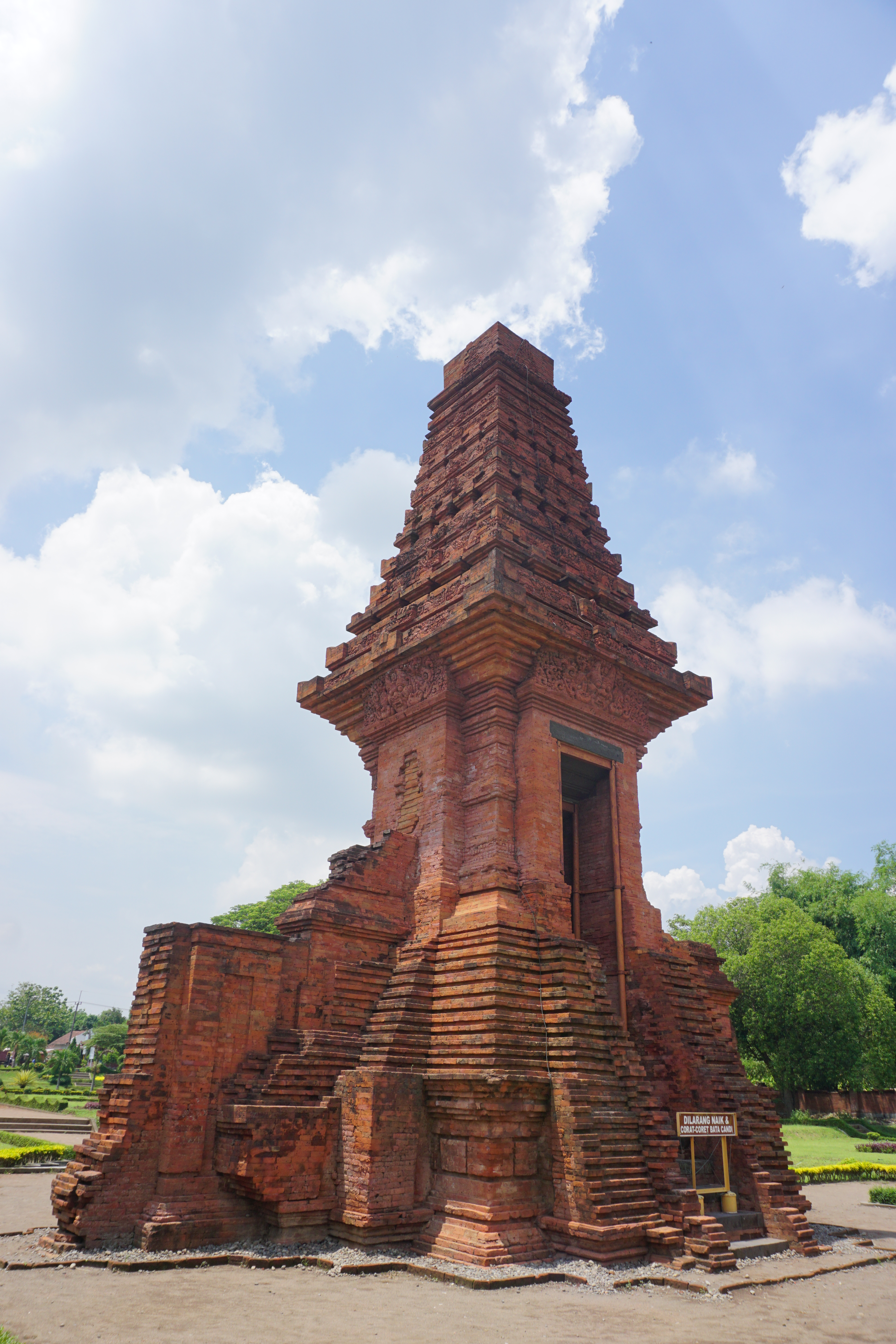
Bajang Ratu, Trowulan, 14th century

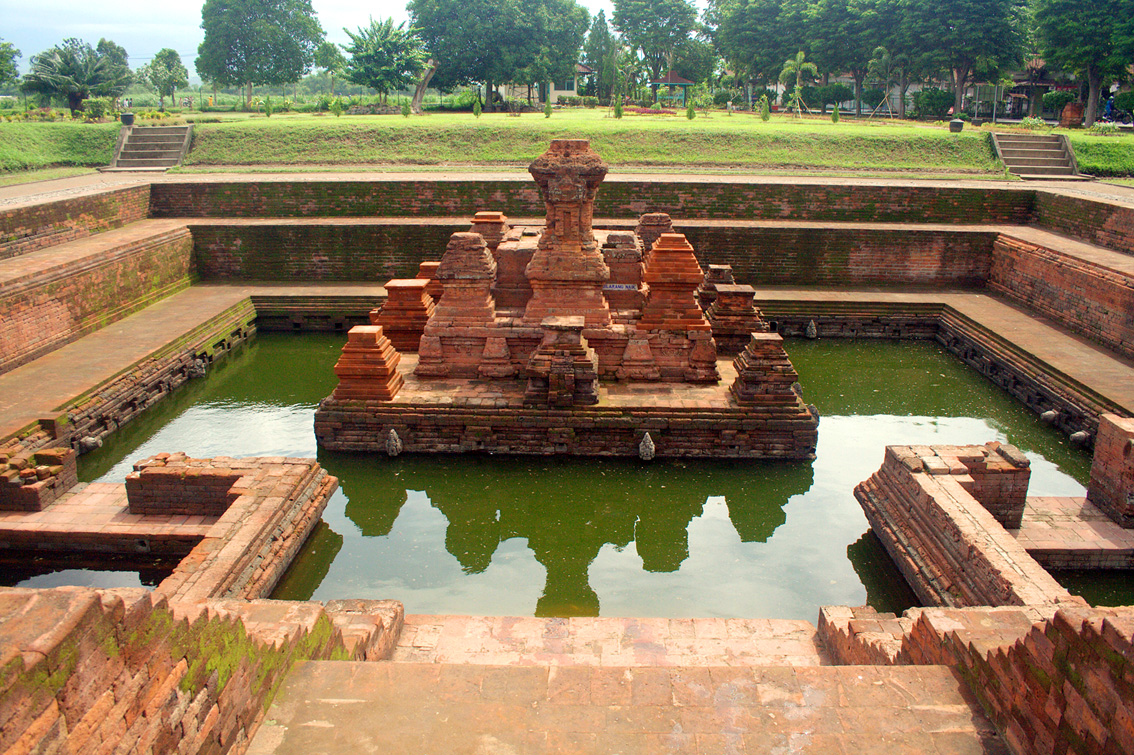
Candi Tikus, Trowulan, 14th century

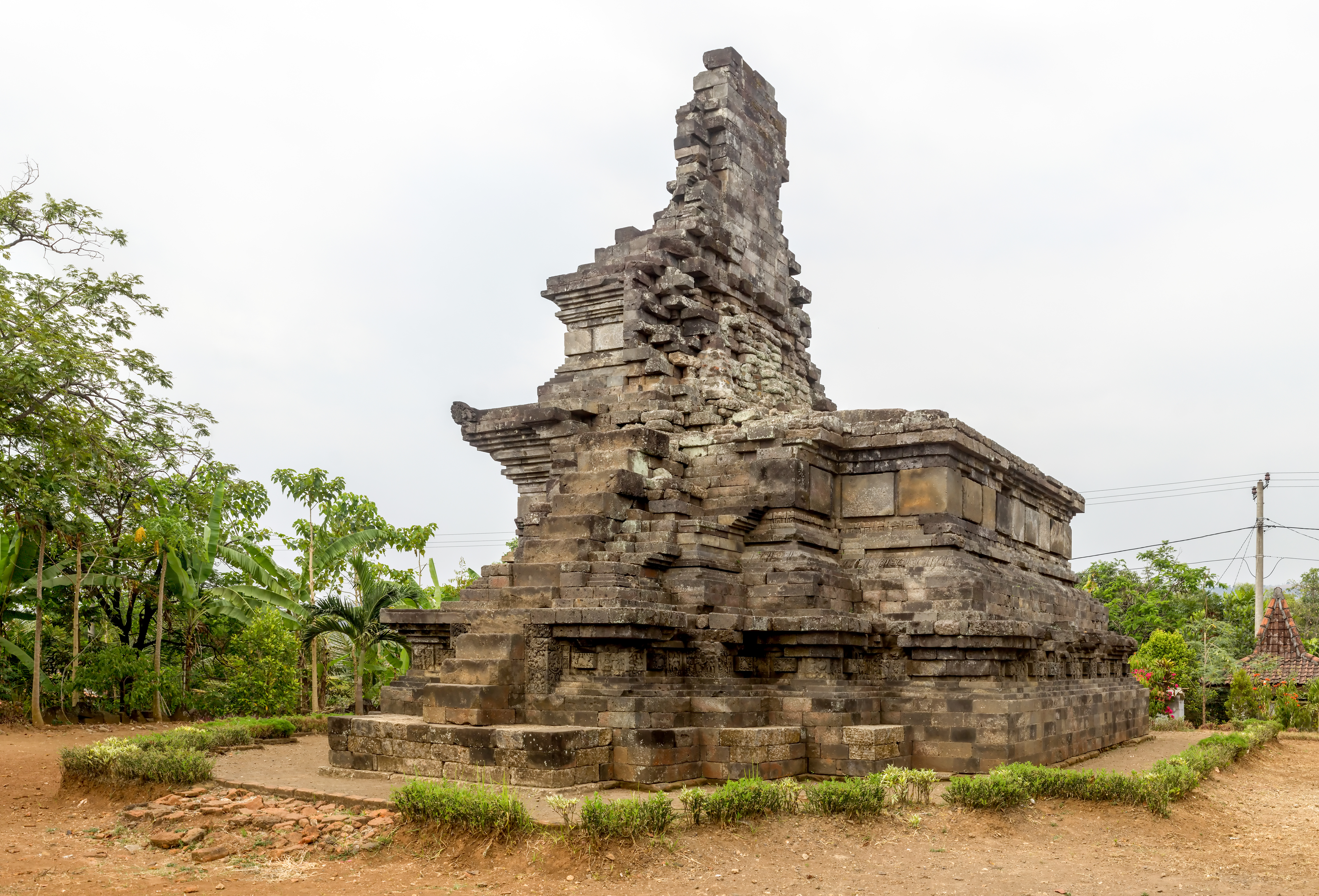
Candi Rimbi, Jombang, 14th century

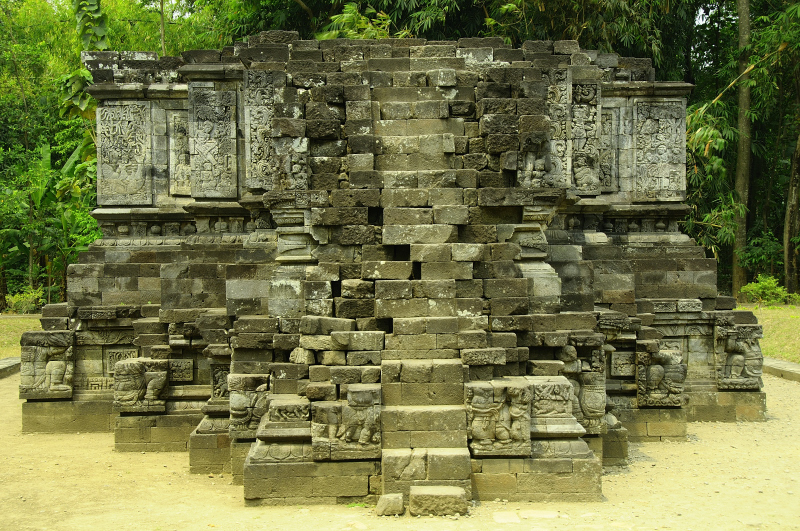
Surawana temple, Kediri, 14th century

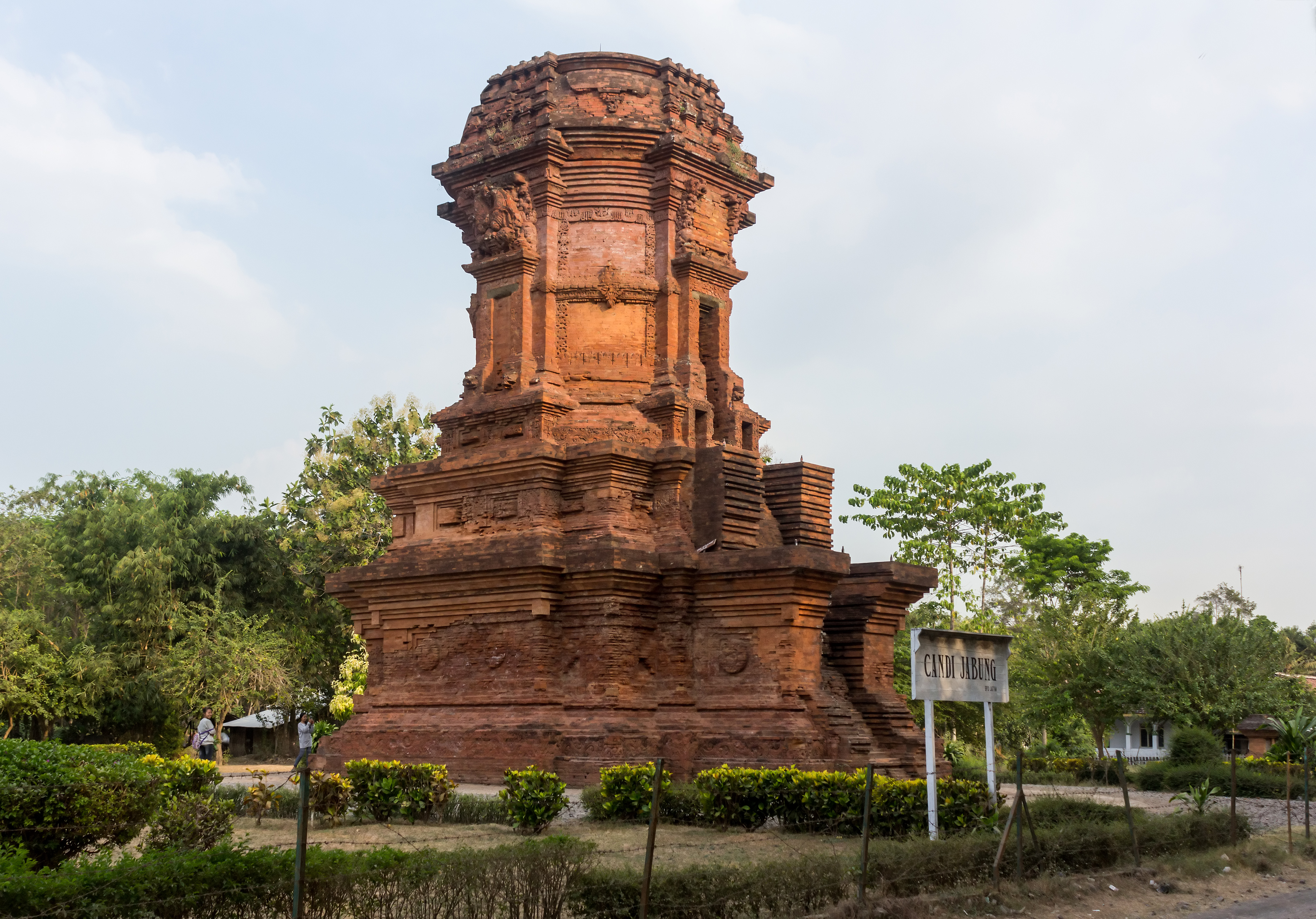
Jabung, Paiton, Probolinggo, 14th century

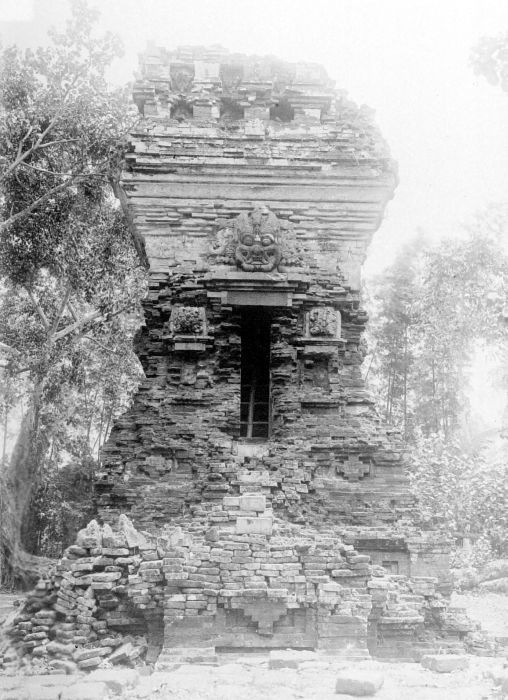
Candi Bangkal, Mojokerto, 14th century

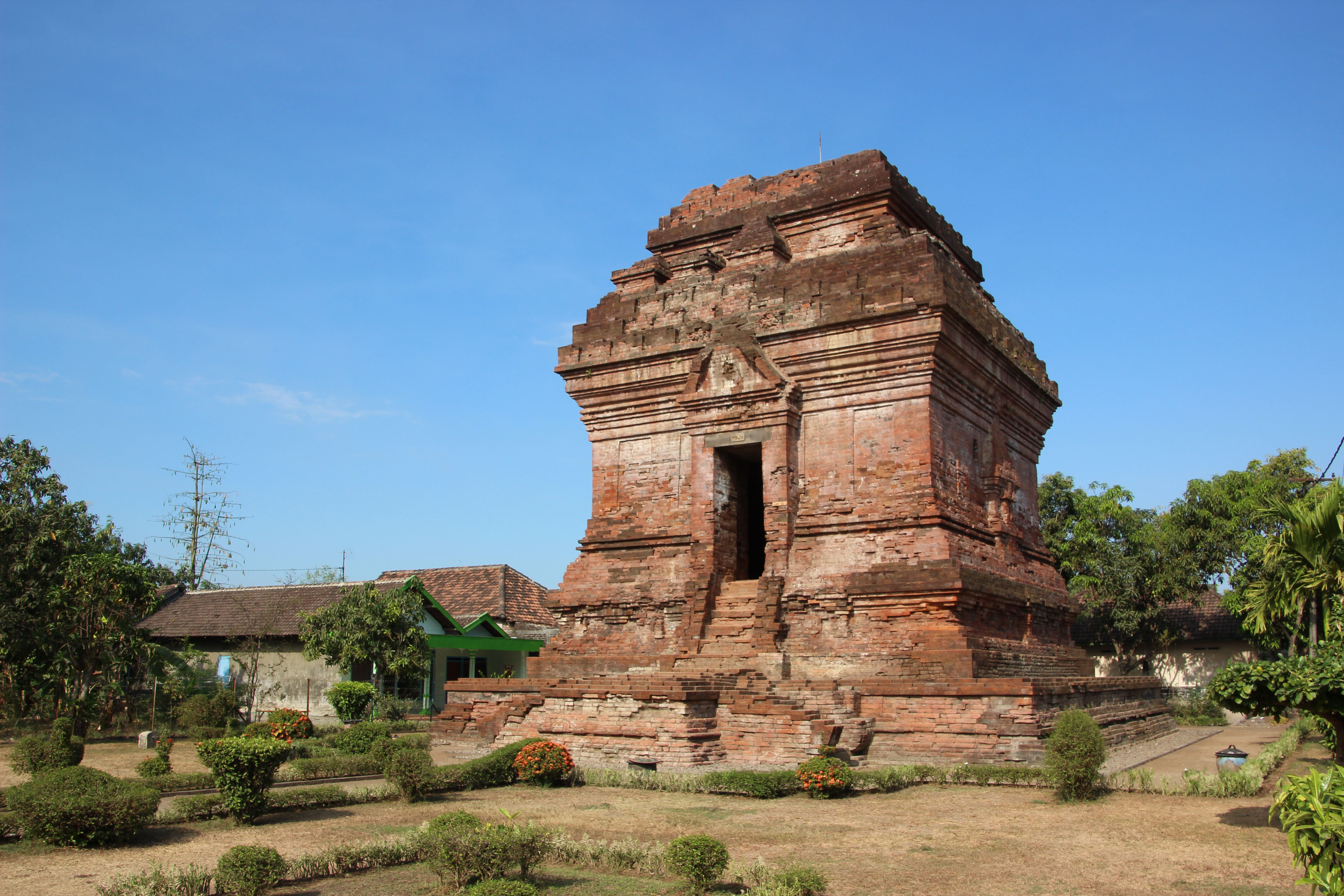
Candi Pari, 14th century, Porong, Sidoarjo

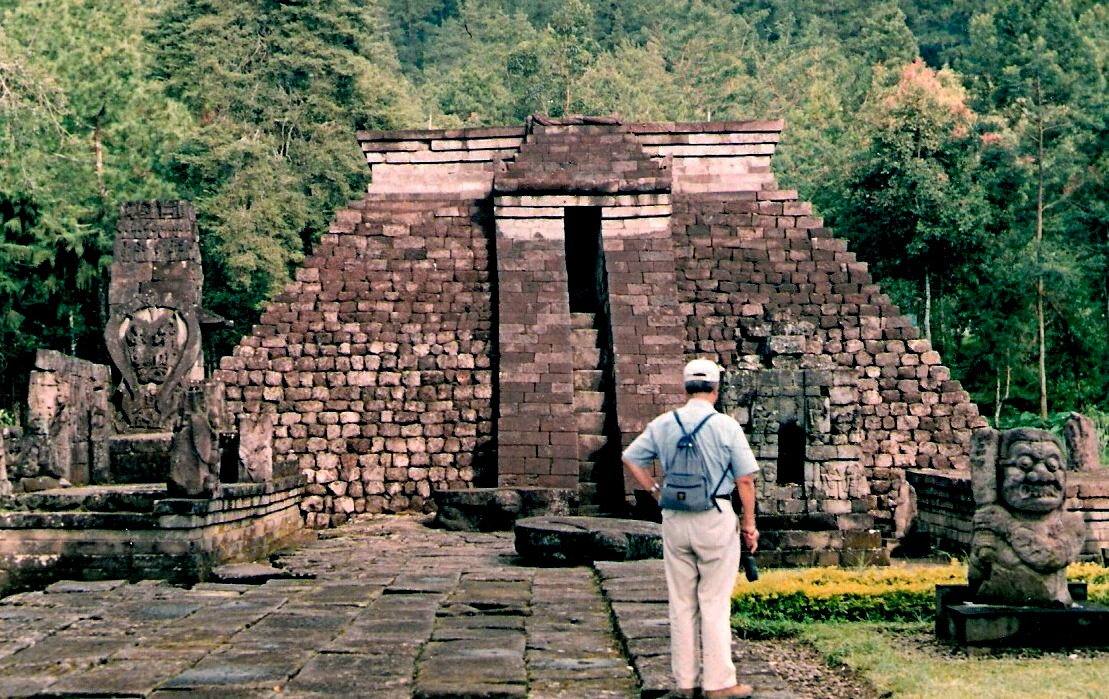
Sukuh, 15th century, Karanganyar

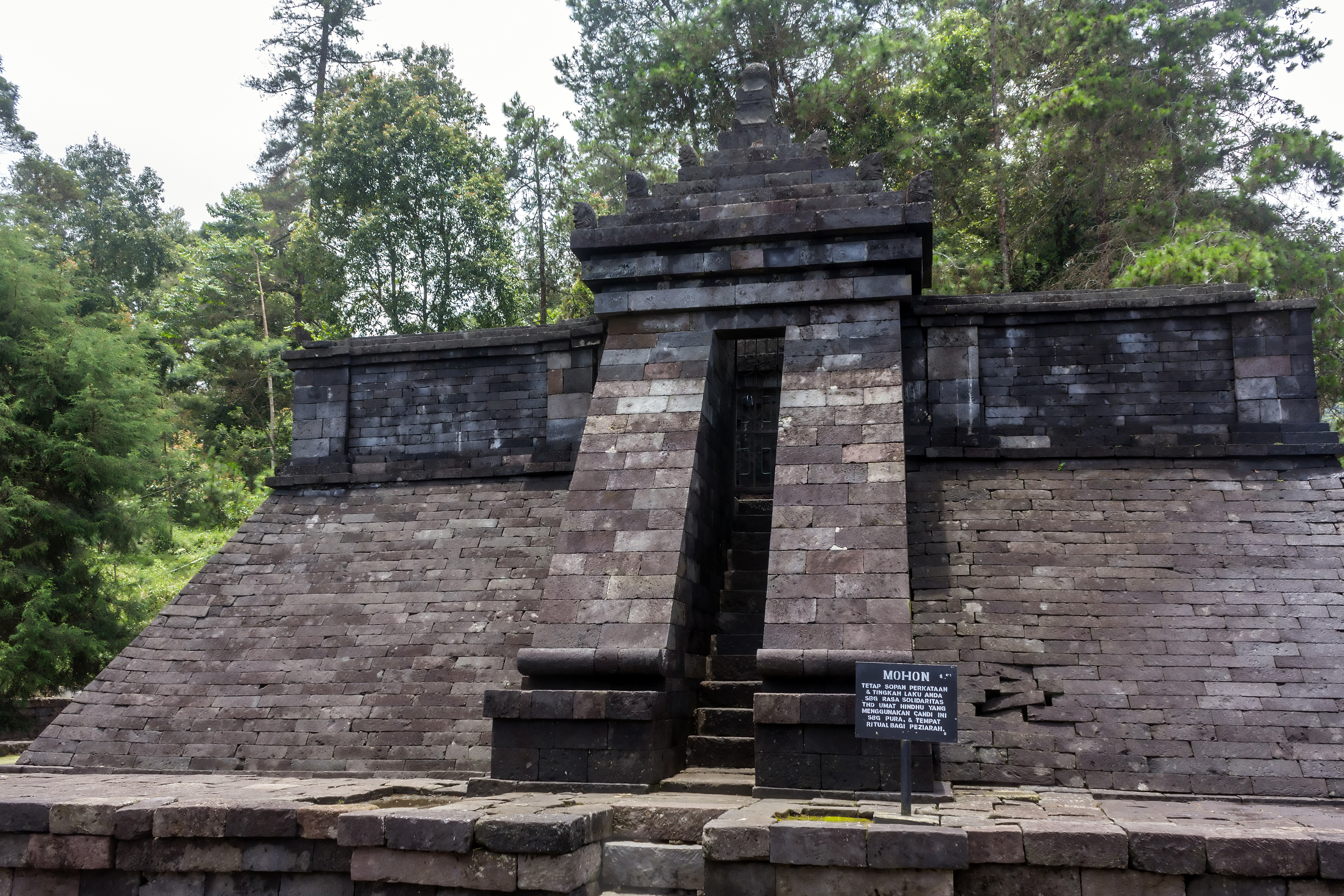
Ceto, 15th century, Karanganyar

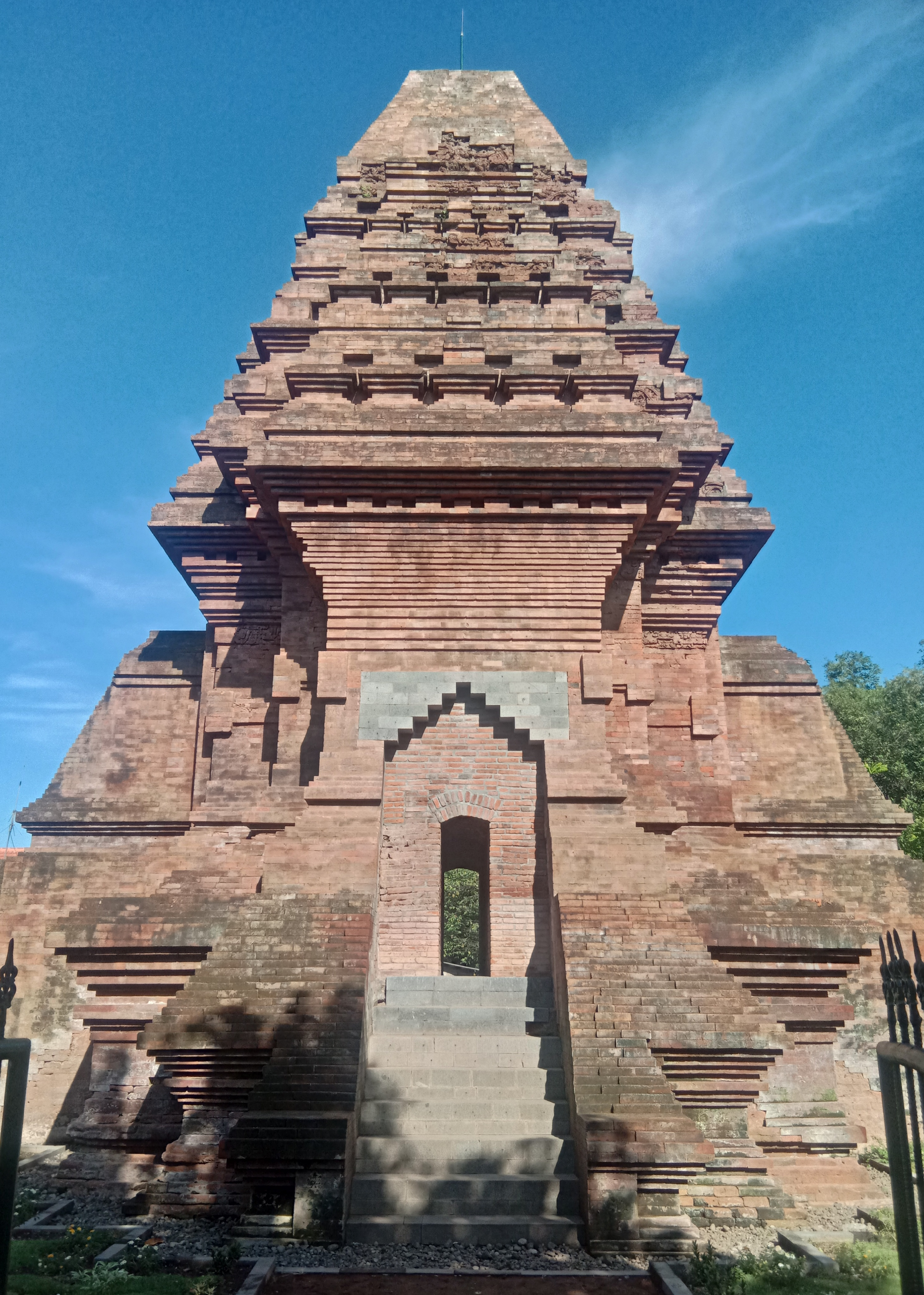
Dermo temple, 14th century, Sidoarjo

== See also ==
- Architecture of Indonesia
- Ancient temples of Java
- Balinese temple
- Buddhism in Indonesia
- Buddhist architecture
- Burmese pagoda
- Candi bentar
- Cetiya
- Chaitya
- Hinduism in Indonesia
- Hinduism in Java
- Hindu temple architecture
- History of Indian influence on Southeast Asia
- Indonesian Esoteric Buddhism
- Kyaung, temples in Myanmar
- Pagodas
- Sand pagoda
- Stupa
- Vihāra
- Wat, temples in Cambodia, Thailand, and Laos
