= Bangkinang =

- Town

Other transcription(s)
  - Jawi: بڠكينڠ
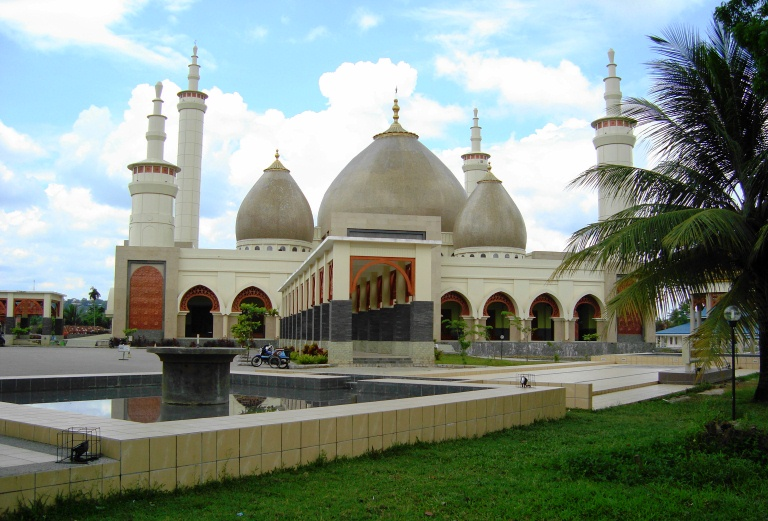
- Islamic Center Kampar regency
- Interactive map of Bangkinang
- Coordinates: 0°21′0″N 101°2′0″E
- Country: Indonesia
- Province: Riau

Area
  - Total: 177.18 km^{2} (68.41 sq mi)

Population (mid 2024 estimate)
  - Total: 40,451
- Time zone: UTC+7 (WIB)

Bangkinang (Jawi: بڠكينڠ), is a town in Riau Province of Indonesia. It is the capital of Kampar Regency, in that province, and is 60 km (37 mi) from Pekanbaru, the Riau provincial capital. As the capital of the regency it is connected both to the provincial capital and to the area of West Sumatra. The majority of the population is Muslim.

== History ==
Based on the decree of the Military Governor of Central Sumatra Number: 10/GM/STE/49 dated 9 November 1949, Kampar Regency was one area in Riau Province of which the capital was Pekanbaru. Then, based on Law No. 12 of 1956, the capital was moved to Bangkinang, a change which was implemented on 6 June 1967. The factors that supported the transfer of the capital to Bangkinang included:

1. Pekanbaru is the capital of Riau province.
2. Pekanbaru, besides being the capital of the province, had also become an independent city.
3. Given the extent of Kampar Regency, moving the Capital to Bangkinang increased efficiency and improved the management of government services to the public.
4. The future prospects Kampar Regency may no longer be developed well from Pekanbaru.

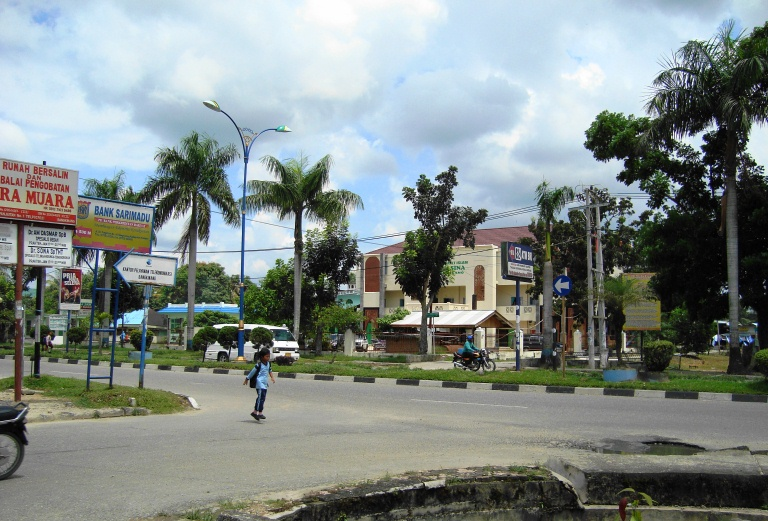
Street on Central Bangkinang

Bangkinang is located in the middle of Kampar Regency, which made it easier to implement services to all districts.

== Climate ==
Bangkinang has a tropical rainforest climate (Af) with heavy rainfall all year round.

Climate data for Bangkinang
Month	Jan	Feb	Mar	Apr	May	Jun	Jul	Aug	Sep	Oct	Nov	Dec	Year
Mean daily maximum °C (°F)	31.2 (88.2)	31.7 (89.1)	32.2 (90.0)	32.4 (90.3)	32.6 (90.7)	32.2 (90.0)	32.0 (89.6)	32.0 (89.6)	31.8 (89.2)	31.7 (89.1)	31.5 (88.7)	31.1 (88.0)	31.9 (89.4)
Daily mean °C (°F)	26.4 (79.5)	26.6 (79.9)	27.1 (80.8)	27.4 (81.3)	27.5 (81.5)	27.0 (80.6)	26.7 (80.1)	26.8 (80.2)	26.8 (80.2)	26.7 (80.1)	26.7 (80.1)	26.4 (79.5)	26.8 (80.3)
Mean daily minimum °C (°F)	21.6 (70.9)	21.6 (70.9)	22.0 (71.6)	22.4 (72.3)	22.4 (72.3)	21.8 (71.2)	21.5 (70.7)	21.6 (70.9)	21.8 (71.2)	21.8 (71.2)	22.0 (71.6)	21.8 (71.2)	21.9 (71.3)
Average rainfall mm (inches)	304 (12.0)	237 (9.3)	294 (11.6)	290 (11.4)	218 (8.6)	150 (5.9)	177 (7.0)	187 (7.4)	214 (8.4)	266 (10.5)	321 (12.6)	339 (13.3)	2,997 (118)
Source: Climate-Data.org

== Tourism ==
Some interesting place in Bangkinang, among others:

- Muara Takus Temple (± 80 km (50 mi) from Bangkinang)
- STANUM Recreational Park
- Bukit Naang Recreational Park
- Merangin Waterfall
- Kandil Kemilau Emas Museum
- Siabu Hill (Bukit Siabu)
- Koto Panjang Dam (PLTA Koto Panjang)
- Cadika Hill Recreational Park (Taman Rekereasi Bukit Cadika)
- Lontiok House (Rumah Asli Lontiok)
