= Tapung =

District in Riau, Indonesia

- District
- Interactive map of Tapung
- Coordinates: 0°33′5.3032″N 101°4′7.7743″E
- Country: Indonesia
- Province: Riau
- Regency: Kampar
- Capital: Petapahan

Area
  - Total: 1,365.97 km^{2} (527.40 sq mi)

Population (mid 2024 estimate)
  - Total: 111,975
  - Density: 81.9747/km^{2} (212.314/sq mi)
- Time zone: UTC+07:00 (Western Indonesia Time)
- Postal code: 28464

Tapung is an administrative district (kecamatan) in Kampar Regency, Riau Province, Indonesia (on Sumatra island).
