= Jami Mosque of Air Tiris =

Mosque in Kampar, Riau, Indonesia

Jami Mosque of Air Tiris Masjid Jami Air Tiris
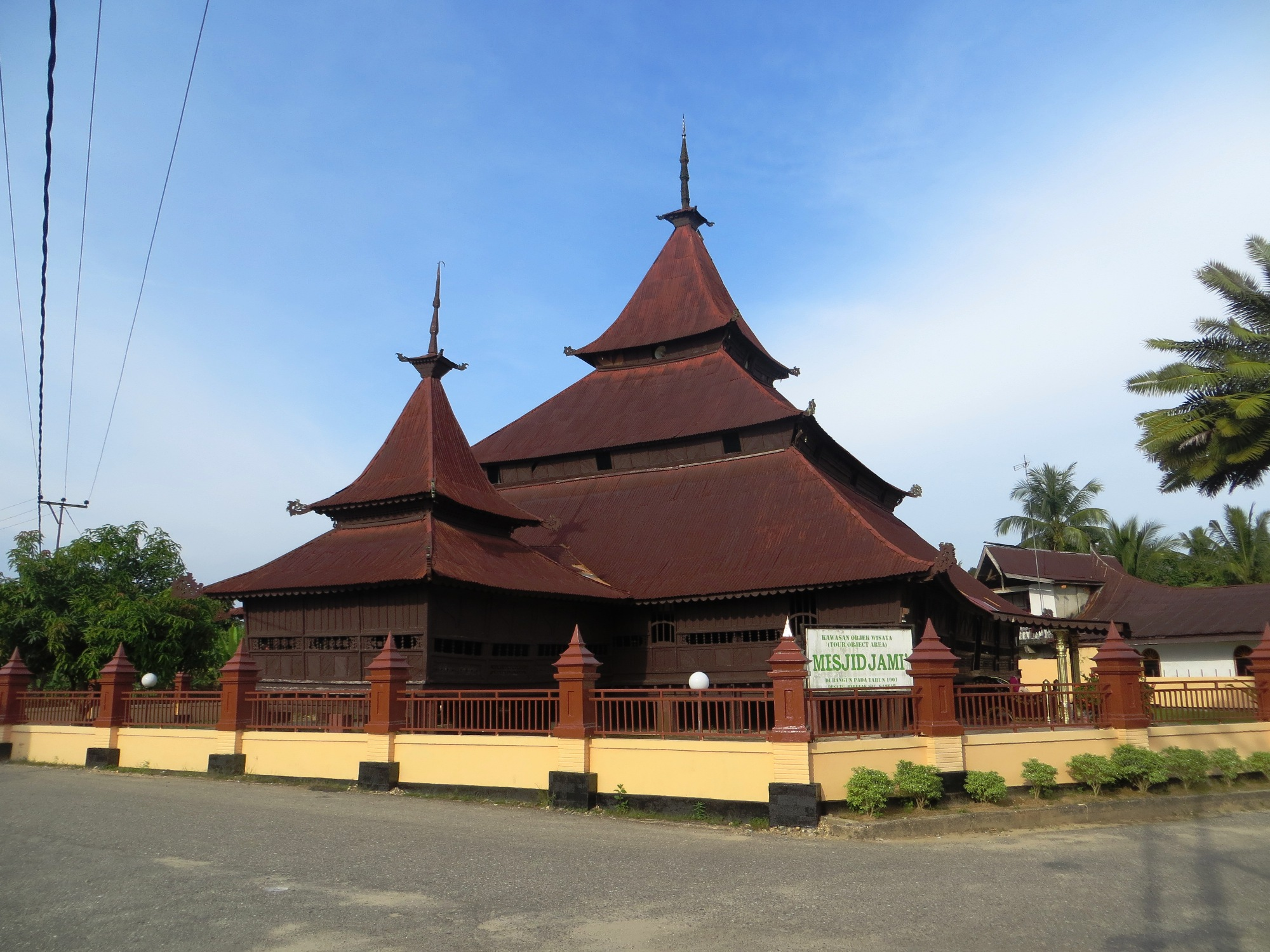

Religion
- Affiliation: Islam
- Branch/tradition: Sunni

Location
- Location: Kampar Regency, Riau, Indonesia
- Interactive map of Jami Mosque of Air Tiris; Masjid Jami Air Tiris
- Coordinates: 0°22′23″N 101°05′38″E

Architecture
- Architect: H. Burhanuddin
- Type: Mosque
- Style: Malay, Chinese
- Groundbreaking: 1901
- Completed: 1904

Specifications
- Dome: 0
- Minaret: 1

Jami Mosque of Air Tiris is a historical congregational mosque in Riau, Indonesia. The mosque is famously known for being built without nails and considered a cultural heritage of the Riau Province. The mosque is located in Air Tiris Village, Kampar Regency, 50 km from Pekanbaru, the capital of Riau Province. The mosque is officially designated as an Object of Cultural Heritage in 2004 based on the decree no. KM.13/PW.007/MKP/2004 adopted by the Minister of Culture and Tourism, I Gede Ardhika.

== Description ==
Jami Mosque of Air Tiris was built in 1901 and inaugurated in 1904, and it is the oldest mosque in Kampar Regency. It was built with a blend of Malay and Chinese architectural styles, with a three-tiered roof in the shape of a pyramid. Originally, the entire building was made of wood, including the roof, but today the roof is replaced with a tin roof. The building has 40 wooden pillars, which symbolize the minimum number of people required for Friday prayer. It is also uniquely constructed by only using pegs and without nails, thus it is built with minimum expenses.

The building was originally a site of Air Tiris market on the riverbank which was founded in 1881. The construction of the mosque was carried out jointly by the local people of Air Tiris, led by the local leader Datuk Ongku Mudo Songkal. The architect was H. Burhanuddin and the construction committee involved the leaders of 24 tribes in the village of Air Tiris. The building is said to be inspired by Demak Mosque in Central Java. The mosque was inaugurated with a qurbani (ritual animal sacrifice) of 10 buffalos.

The locals believe the divine power protects the mosque. It is said the Dutch colonial government once attempted to burn the mosque by dousing it with oil, but the mosque stood intact. In 2016, there was a severe flood, with the surrounding area submerged in water, but the water did not rise in the mosque compound. There are several artifacts inside the mosque that locals believe endowed by divine power, including two wooden pillars of the mosque as well as a sacred stone in the shape of a buffalo head.

The mosque is a popular destination for the locals, especially during the Islamic holidays of Isra and Miraj, Maulid Nabi, and Eid al-Fitr. Recently, many international tourists visit the place especially from Malaysia and Singapore.
