= Lontiok House =

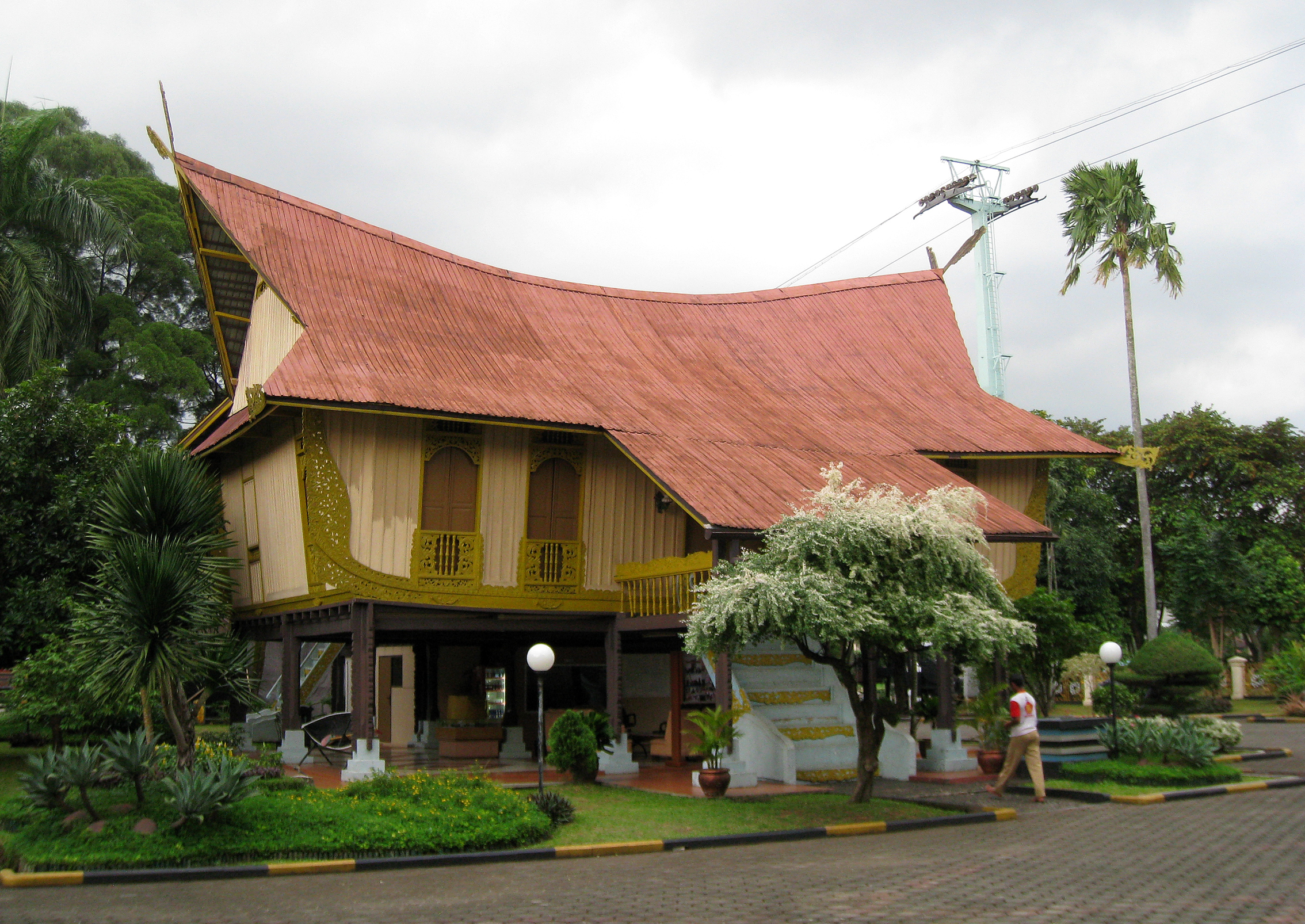
A Lontiok house, a traditional house of Kampar in Riau Province, Sumatra.

Rumah Lontiok (meaning Lontiok House) is a traditional house of Kampar, Riau Province. Lontiok (lentik in Bahasa Indonesia) means arched or curved. Lontiok term corresponds to the form of roof ridge which is arched upward as a symbol to honor Allah. Another terms used for Rumah Lontiok is Rumah Pencalang or Rumah Lancang (traditional sailing wooden ship). It is based on the similarities between the base of front and back of wooden wall with Lancang (the wooden sailing ship), the similarities between the form of the outer leaning of wooden wall of Lontiok House with lancang which is leaning outward, and the similarities between Lontiok House with traditional wooden sailing ship house (magon) made by the community living onto the river and sea.

The space or room inside of Rumah Lontiok are classified into three different spaces; they are lower space, central space, and back space. The classification of those spaces are adjusted to the terms "Alam nan tigo" or "universe of three divisions", a concept of sociality in society. They are berkawan (friendship), bersamak (kinship), and semalu (bashfulness).

Lower and central spaces, separated by a wooden wall, are the main house. Lower space itself, a symbol of companionship, is divided into two different functions; lower edge and lower base. Lower edge room is used for ninik mamak (honorable men) and guests sitting place in certain ceremonies. Furthermore, it is used as praying room in daily life too. Whereas, the Lower base house is used for sitting place for ninik mamak as house owners. Besides that, it is used as their sleeping room,

Central space, symbolizes alam bersamak (family kinship), is divided into two; they are Poserek and central edging. Poserek is gathering place for older woman and children. It might be used as sleeping room for women and children in necessity situation. Whereas, the central edging is used for sleeping room for house owners. Bride and groom bridals chairs may be placed in this room when wedding party takes place.

Back space is divided into two; sulo pandan and pedapuan (kitchen). Sulo Pandan is the room for keeping daily needs and cooking utensils. Whereas, pedapuan is used for kitchen, family eating place, and woman guest servicing. Sometimes, it may be used as sleeping room for unmarried daughter. This room is a reflection of alam semalu (bashfulness), a place to keep family secret.

Decoration type of used at Rumah Lontiok consists of several types; they are plants and animals style, geometrical style in form of kundur blossom, fern root, selembayung in form of buffalo head, over hanging bee, rebung (bamboo shoot) sprout, star, etc.
