= Tambang =

District in Riau, Indonesia

- District
- Interactive map of Tambang
- Coordinates: 0°23′39.7392″N 101°15′3.4884″E
- Country: Indonesia
- Province: Riau
- Regency: Kampar

Area
  - Total: 371.94 km^{2} (143.61 sq mi)

Population (mid 2024 estimate)
  - Total: 97,803
  - Density: 262.95/km^{2} (681.05/sq mi)
- Time zone: UTC+07:00 (Western Indonesia Time)
- Postal code: 28468

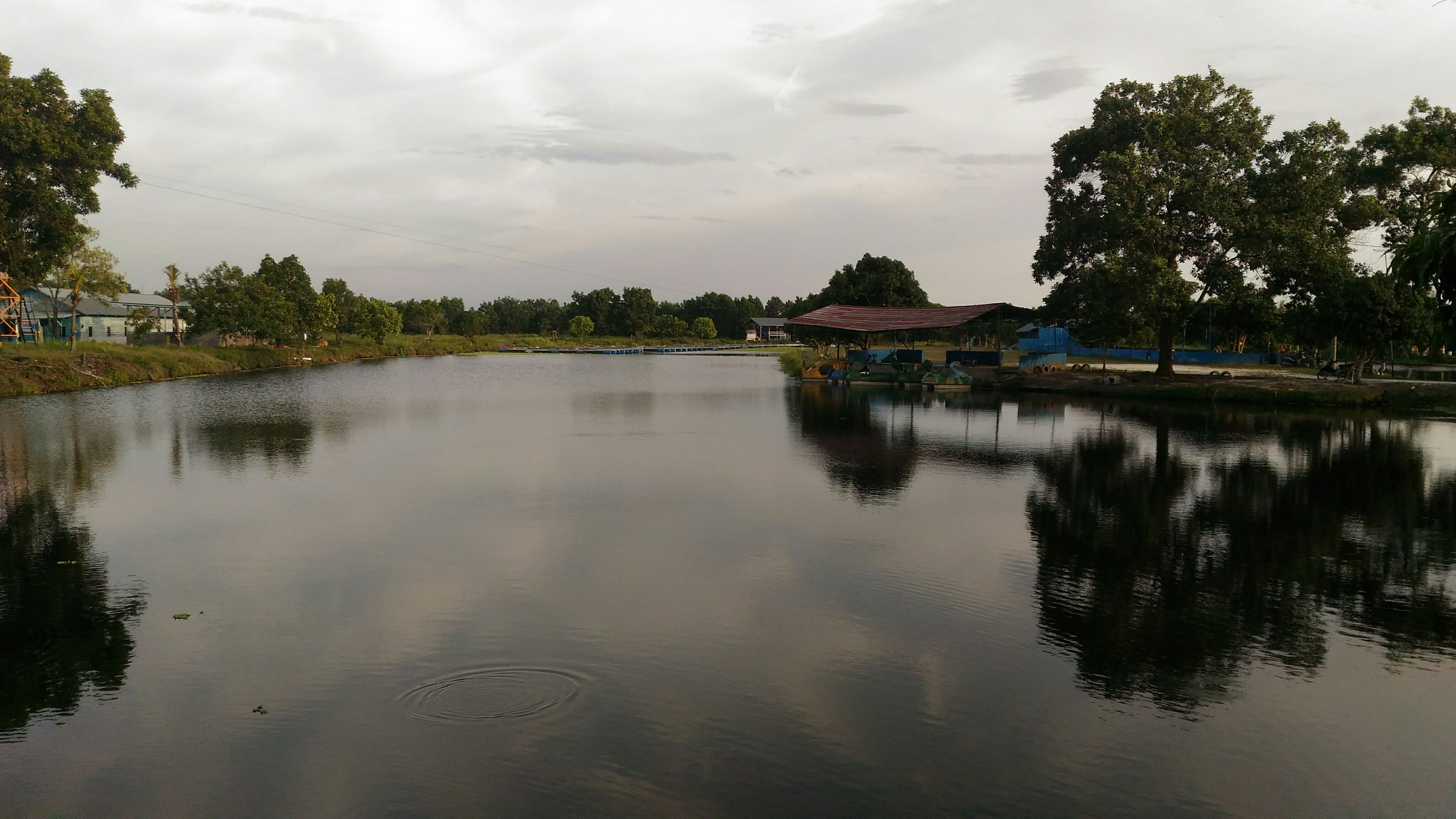
Tourist lake in Tambang District, 2017

Tambang is an administrative district (kecamatan) in Kampar Regency, Riau, Indonesia.
