= Buddhist temple =

Buddhist place of worship

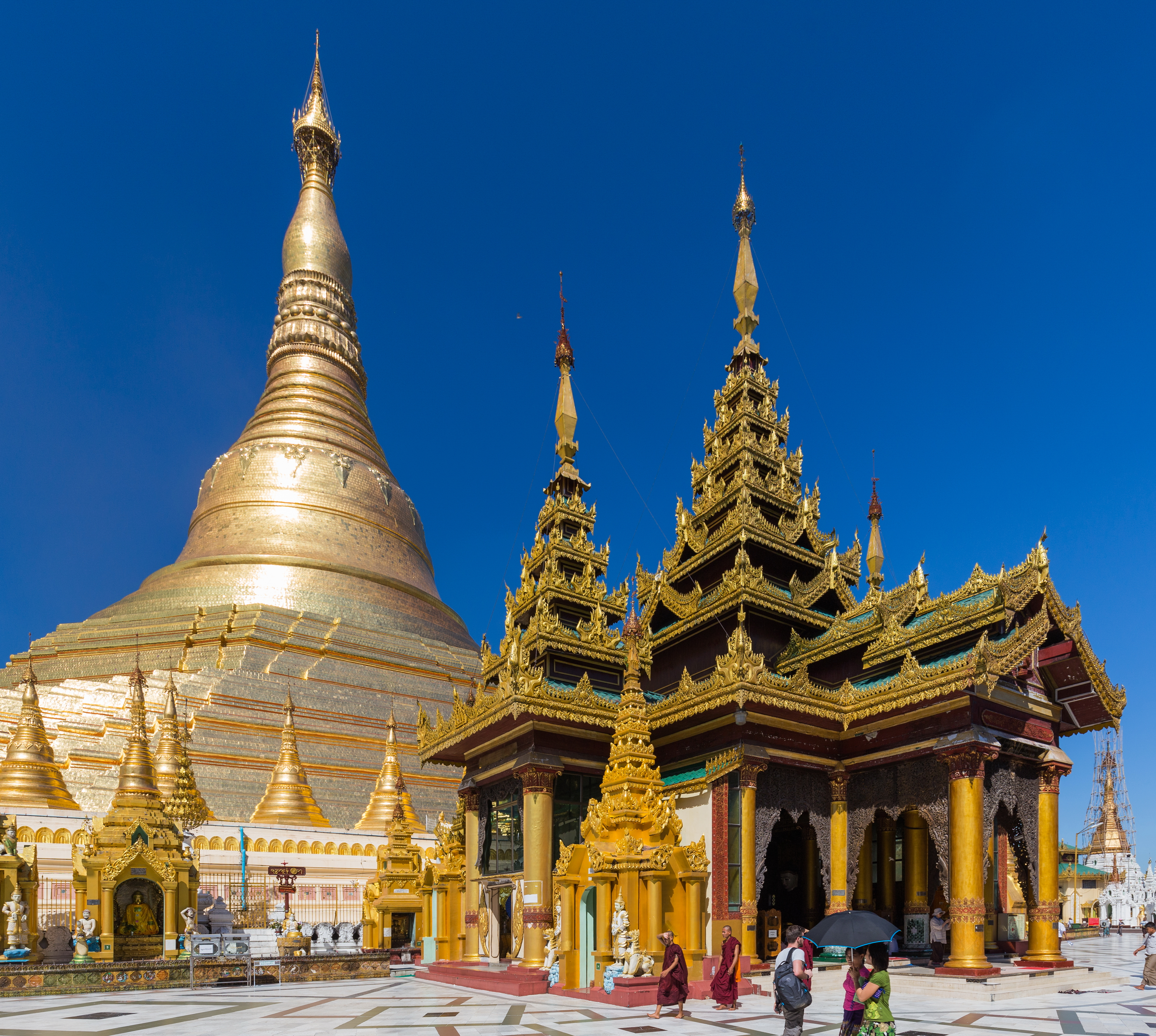
Shwedagon Pagoda, a fourteenth century Theravada Buddhist temple in Yangon, Myanmar

A Buddhist temple or Buddhist monastery is the place of worship for adherents of Buddhism. They include the structures called vihāra, chaitya, stupa, wat, khurul, and pagoda in different regions and languages. Temples in Buddhism represent the pure land or pure environment of a Buddha. Traditional Buddhist temples are designed to inspire both inner and outer peace.

Buddhist temples follow a set of architectural guides adhering to Buddhist architecture principal, with stylistic derivatives seen throughout South Asia, Southeast Asia, and East Asia.

== Architecture ==
Its architecture and structure varies from region to region. Usually, the temple consists not only of its buildings, but also the surrounding environment. The Buddhist temples are designed to symbolize five elements: fire, air, water, earth and void (space).

== India ==
Indian temple design was influenced by the idea of a place of worship as a representation of the universe. For Buddhist temple complexes one tall temple is often centrally located and surrounded by smaller temples and walls. This center surrounded by oceans, lesser mountains and a huge wall.

A Chaitya, Chaitya hall or Chaitya-griha refers to a shrine, sanctuary, temple or prayer hall in Indian religions. The term is most common in Buddhism, where it refers to a space with a stupa and a rounded apse at the end opposite the entrance, and a high roof with a rounded profile. Strictly speaking, the chaitya is the stupa itself, and the Indian buildings are chaitya halls, but this distinction is often not observed. Many of the early Chaitya were rock-cut, as in Karla Caves or Ajanta.

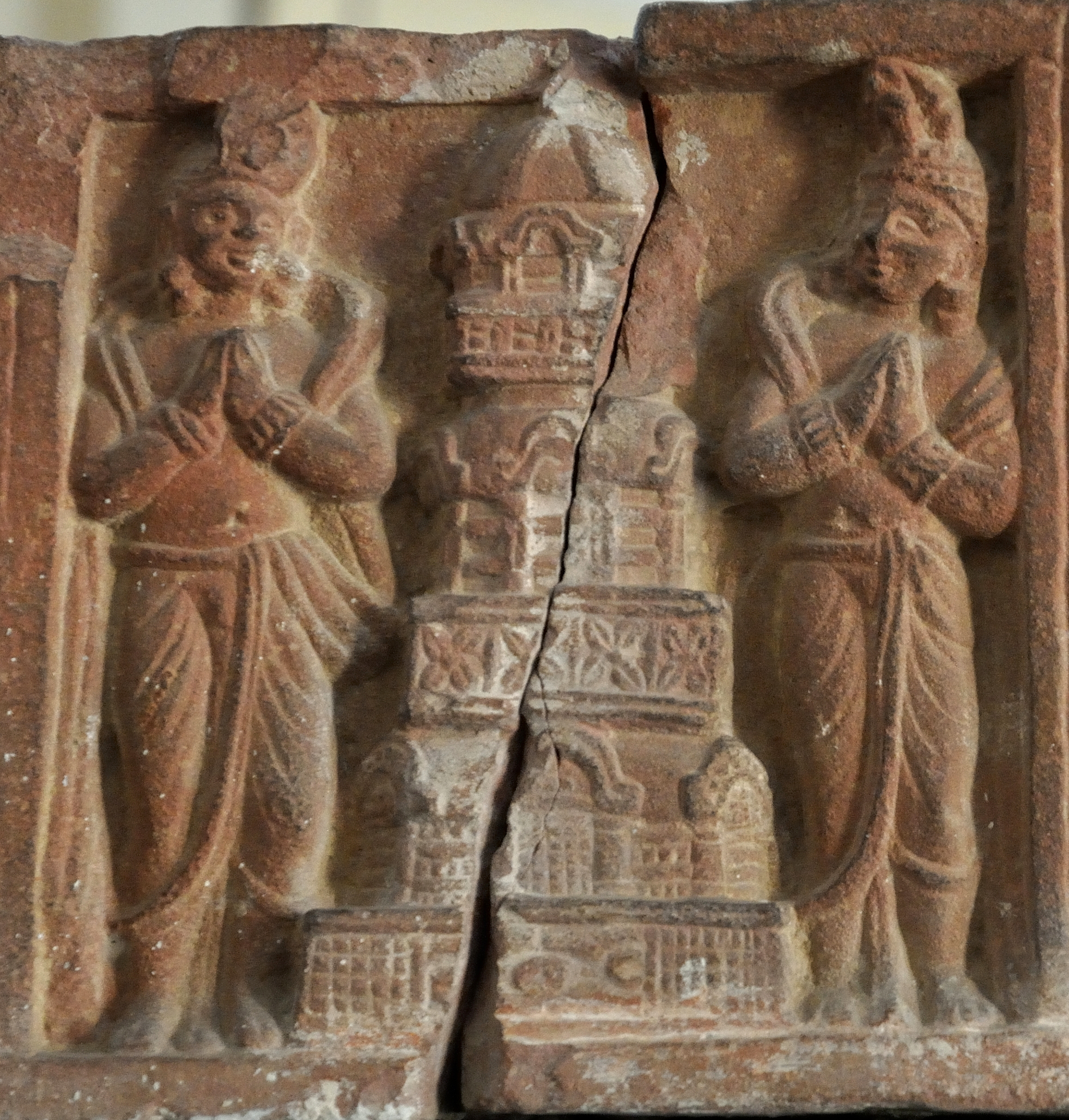
Tall circular Buddhist temple, early 1st Century CE, Mathura Museum

Some of the earliest free-standing temples may have been of a circular type. Ashoka also built the Mahabodhi Temple in Bodh Gaya circa 250 BCE, a circular structure, in order to protect the Bodhi tree under which the Buddha had found enlightenment. The Bairat Temple is also a round structure, which can be seen through archaeological remains. Representations of this early temple structure are found on a 100 BCE relief sculpted on the railing of the stupa at Bhārhut, as well as in Sanchi. From that period the Diamond throne remains, an almost intact slab of sandstone decorated with reliefs, which Ashoka had established at the foot of the Bodhi tree. These circular-type temples were also found in later rock-hewn caves such as Tulja Caves or Guntupalli.

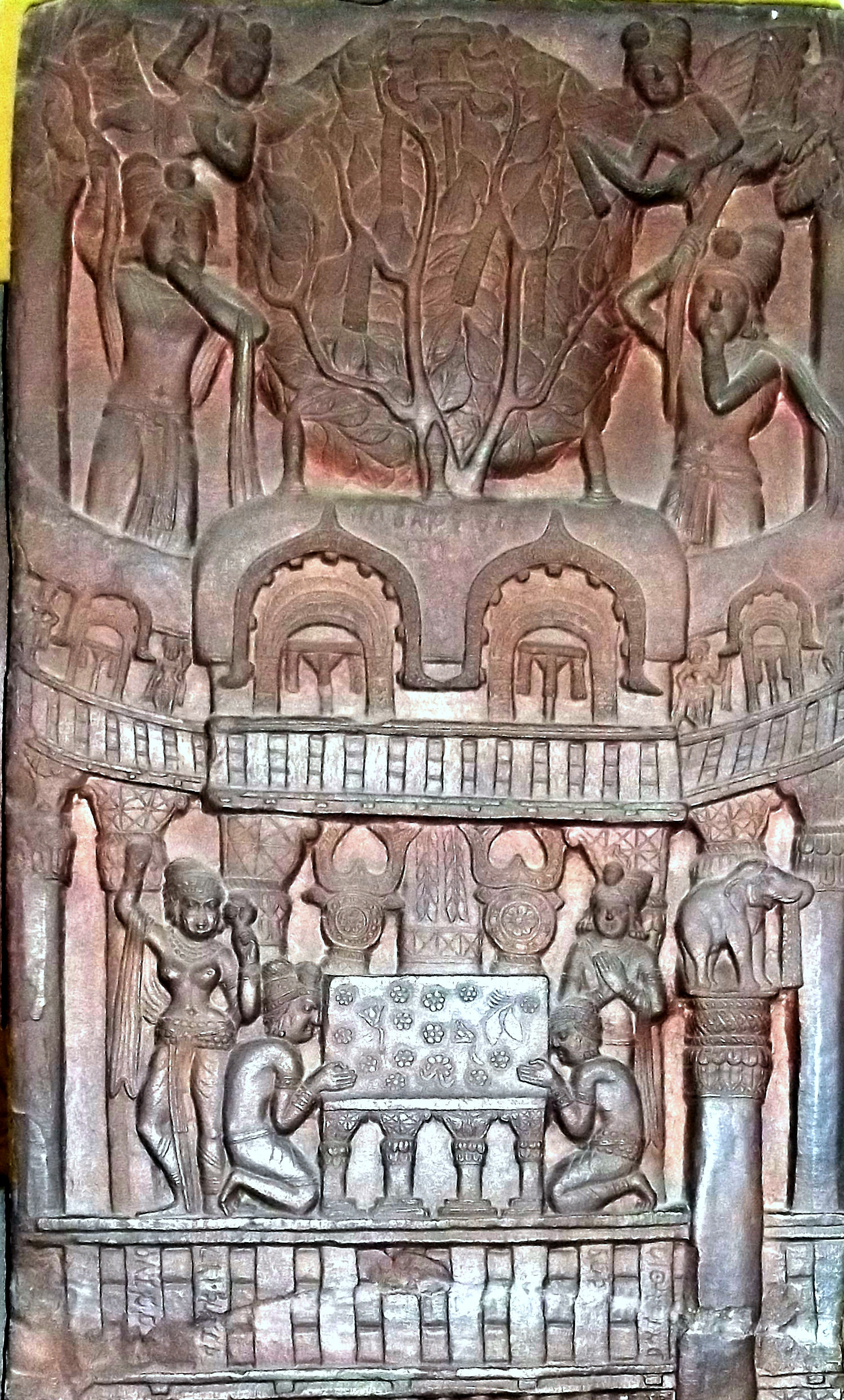
Ashoka's Mahabodhi Temple and Diamond throne in Bodh Gaya, built circa 250 BCE. Bharhut frieze

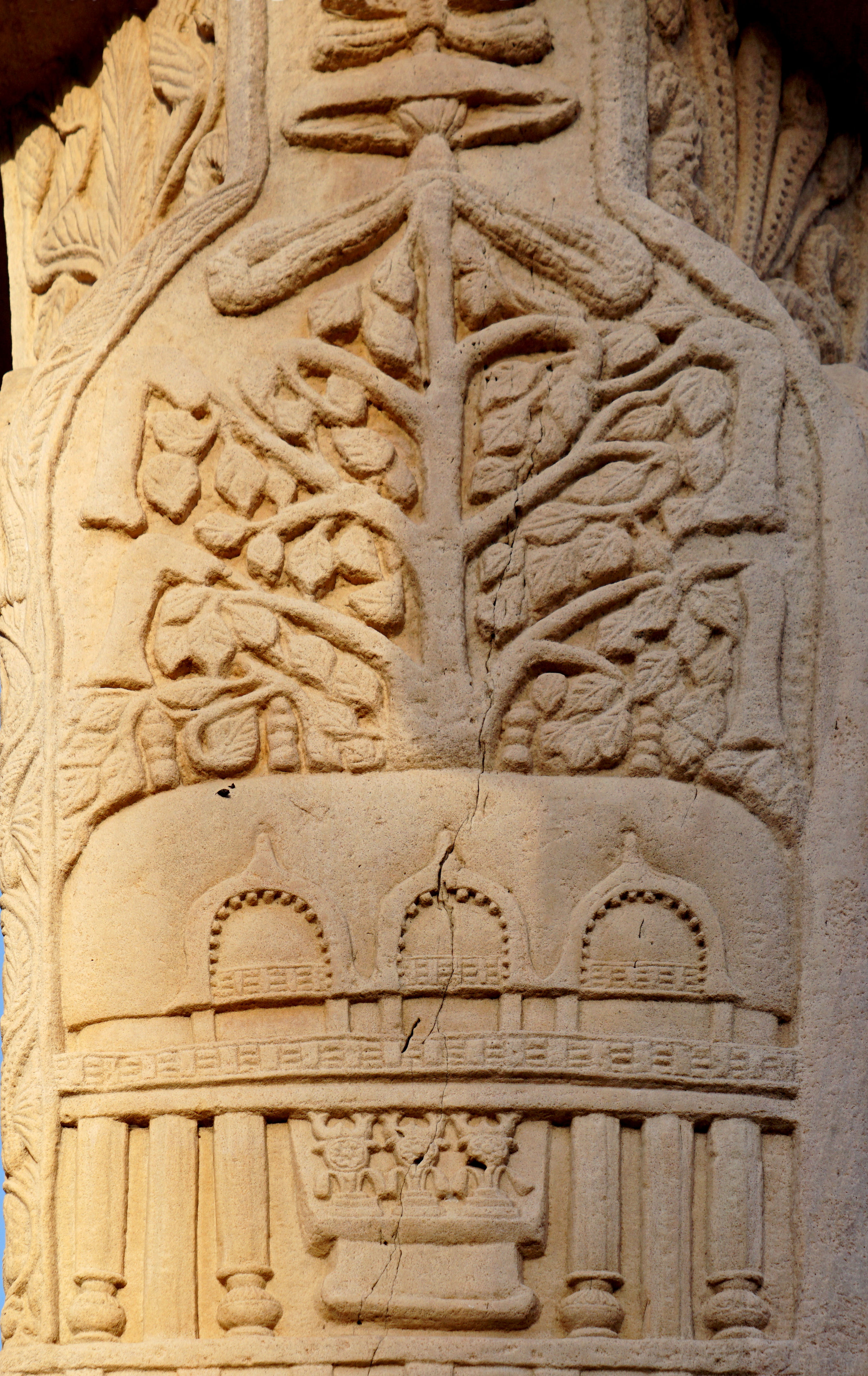
Bodhi tree temple depicted in Sanchi, Stupa 1, Southern gateway

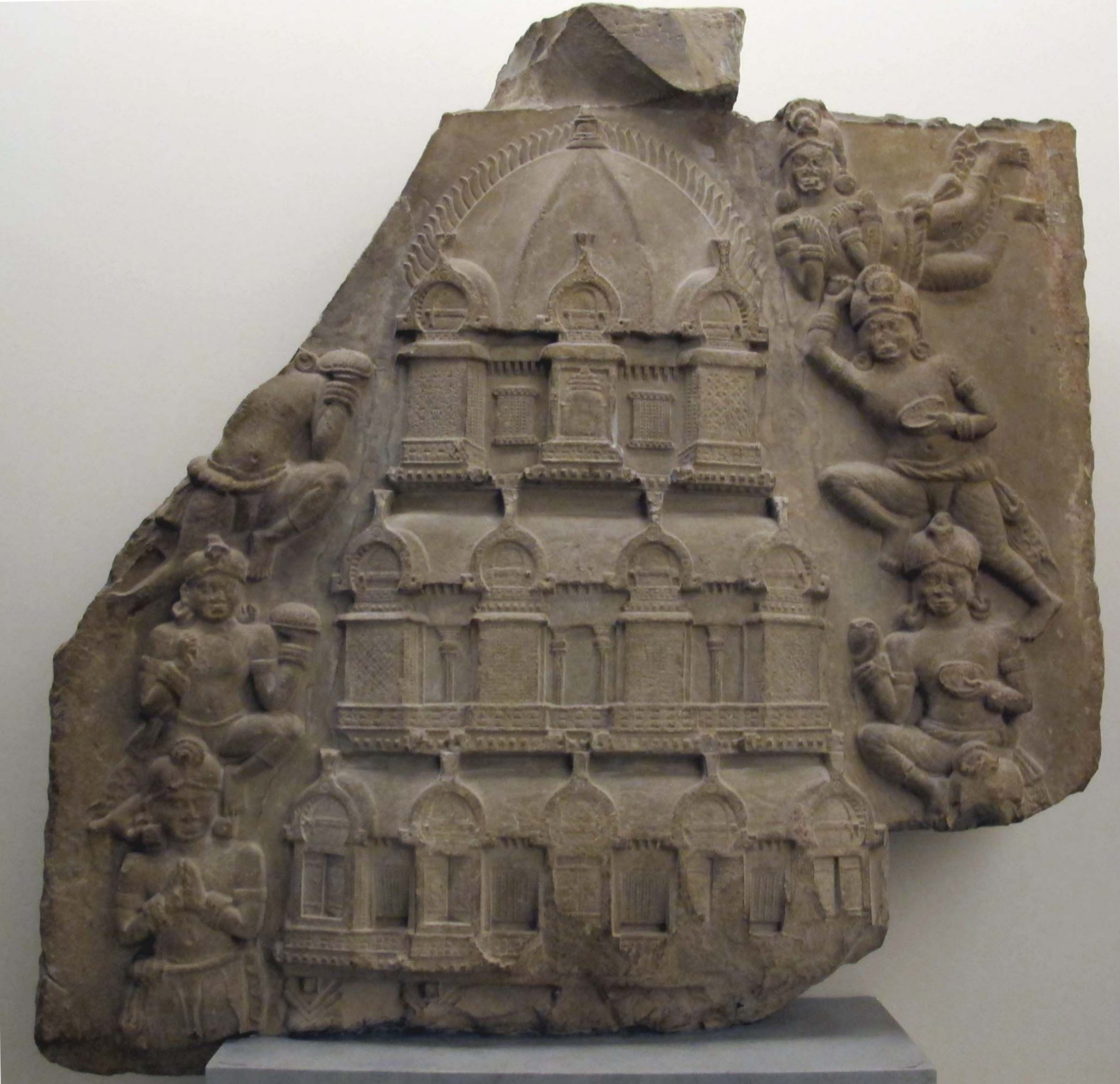
Relief of a multi-storied temple, 2nd century CE, Ghantasala Stupa

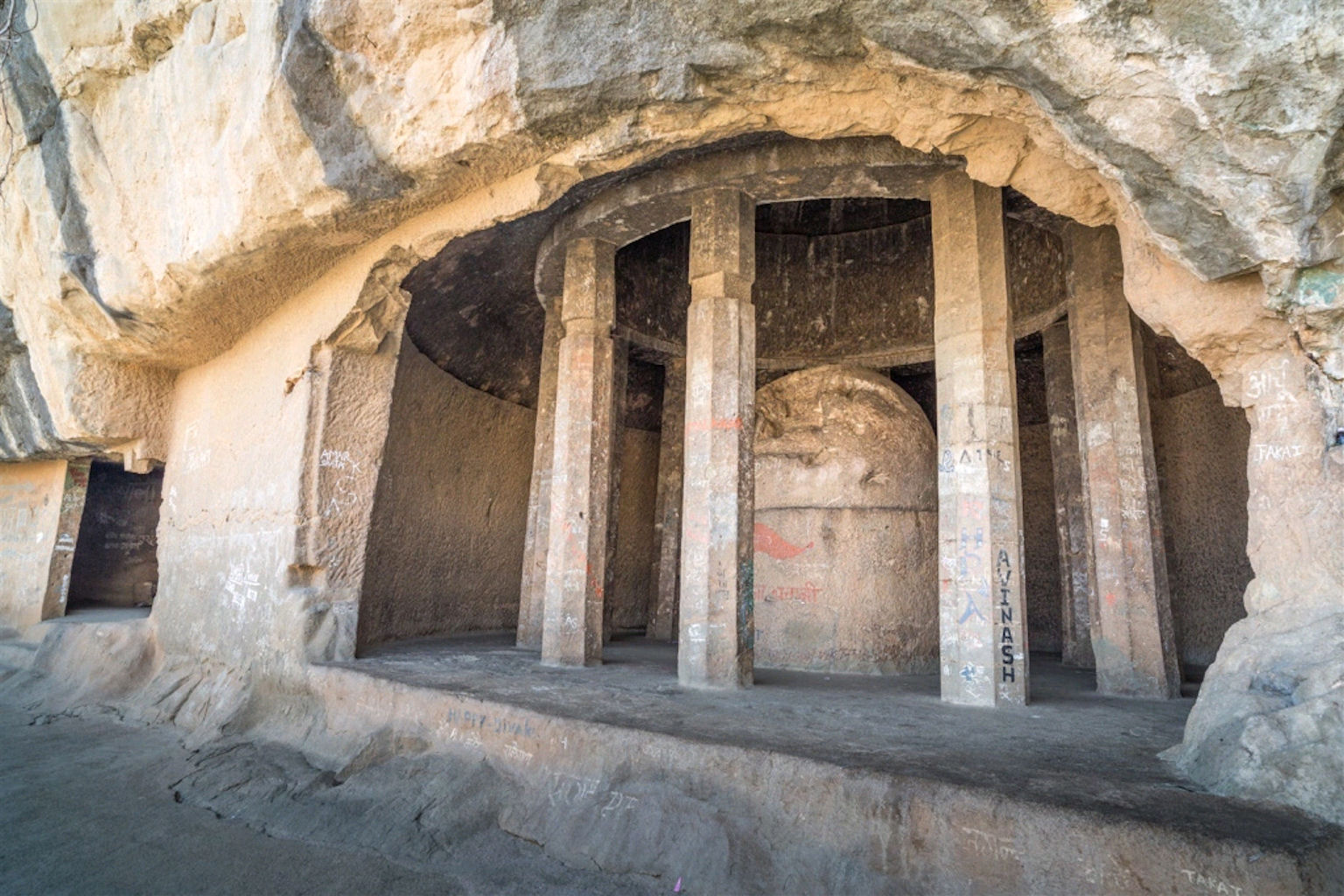
Remains of the circular rock-hewn circular Chaitya with columns, Tulja Caves

== Indonesia ==
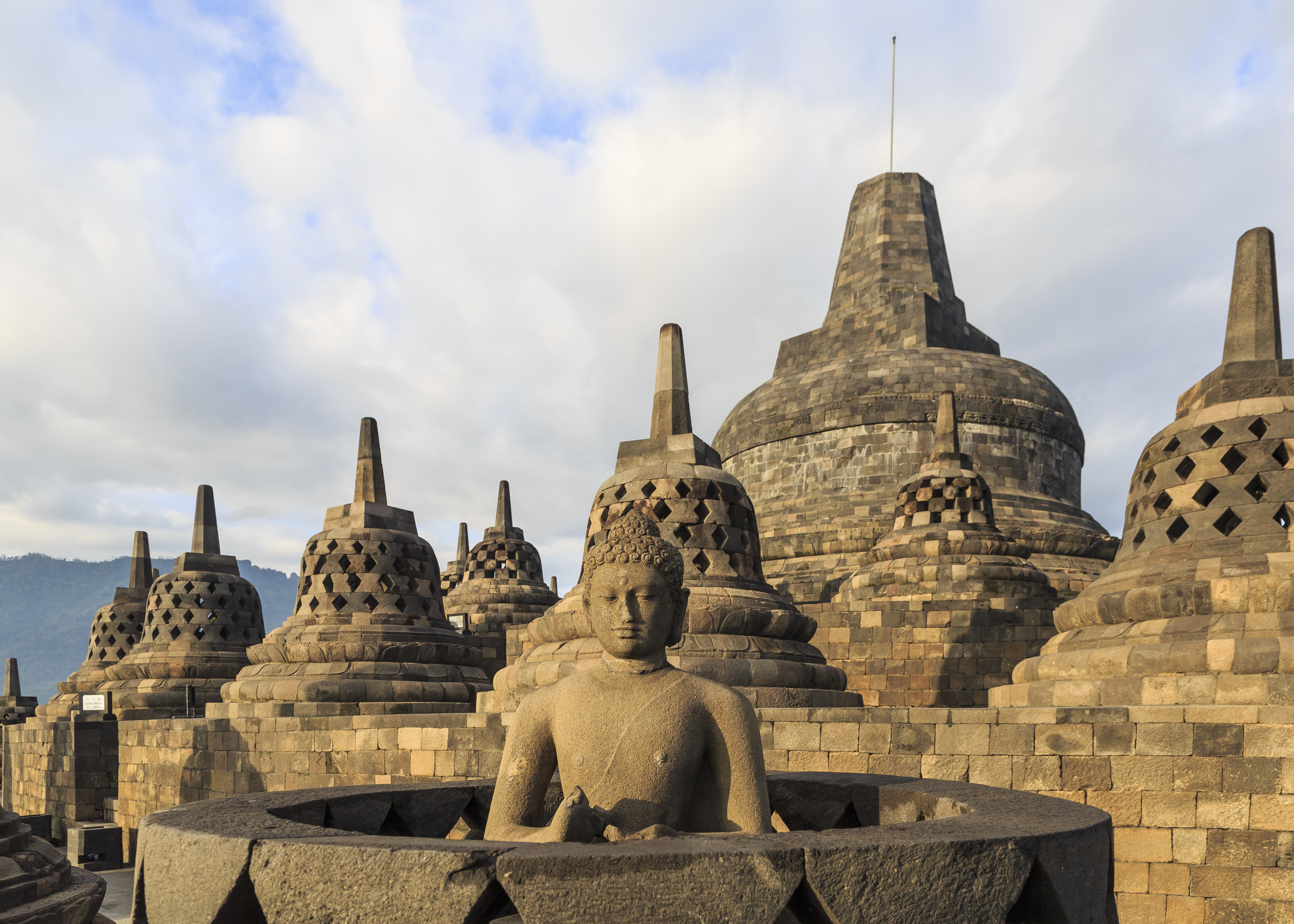
Borobudur in Central Java, the world's largest Buddhist temple

Buddhism is the second oldest religion in Indonesia after Hinduism, which arrived from India around the second century. The history of Buddhism in Indonesia is closely related to the history of Hinduism, as a number of empires influenced by Indian culture were established around the same period. The oldest Buddhist archaeological site in Indonesia is arguably the Batujaya stupas complex in Karawang, West Java. The oldest relic in Batujaya was estimated to originate from the 2nd century, while the latest dated from the 12th century. Subsequently, significant numbers of Buddhist sites were found in Jambi, Palembang and Riau provinces in Sumatra, as well as in Central and East Java. The Indonesian archipelago has, over the centuries, witnessed the rise and fall of powerful Buddhist empires, such as the Sailendra dynasty, the Mataram and Srivijaya empires.

According to some Chinese source, a Chinese Buddhist monk I-tsing on his pilgrim journey to India, witnessed the powerful maritime empire of Srivijaya based on Sumatra in the 7th century. A number of Buddhist historical heritages can be found in Indonesia, including the 8th century Borobudur mandala monument and Sewu temple in Central Java, Batujaya in West Java, Muaro Jambi, Muara Takus and Bahal temple in Sumatra, and numerous of statues or inscriptions from the earlier history of Indonesian Hindu-Buddhist kingdoms.

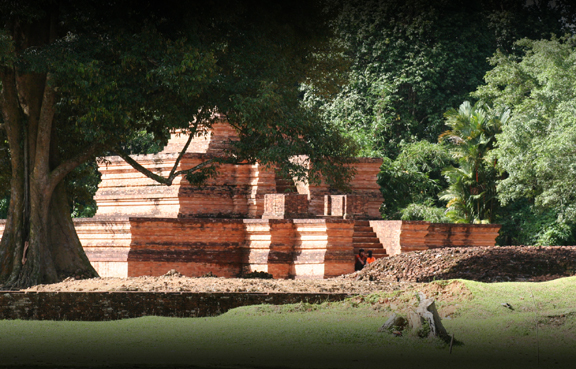
Candi tinggi, a temple within the Muaro Jambi temple compound

During the era of the Kediri, Singhasari and Majapahit empires, Buddhism—identified as Dharma ri Kasogatan—was acknowledged as one of the kingdom's official religions along with Hinduism. Although some of kings might favour Hinduism over another, nevertheless the harmony, toleration and even syncretism were promoted as manifested in Bhinneka Tunggal Ika national motto, coined from Kakawin Sutasoma, written by Mpu Tantular to promotes tolerance between Hindus (Shivaites) and Buddhists. The classical era of ancient Java also had produces some of the exquisite examples of Buddhist arts, such as the statue of Prajnaparamita and the statue of Buddha Vairochana and Boddhisttva Padmapani and Vajrapani in Mendut temple.

In contemporary Indonesian Buddhist perspective, Candi refers to a shrine, either ancient or new. Several contemporary viharas in Indonesia for example, contain the actual-size replica or reconstruction of famous Buddhist temples, such as the replica of Pawon and Plaosan's perwara (small) temples. In Buddhism, the role of a candi as a shrine is sometimes interchangeable with a stupa, a domed structure to store Buddhist relics or the ashes of cremated Buddhist priests, patrons or benefactors.

== Japan ==
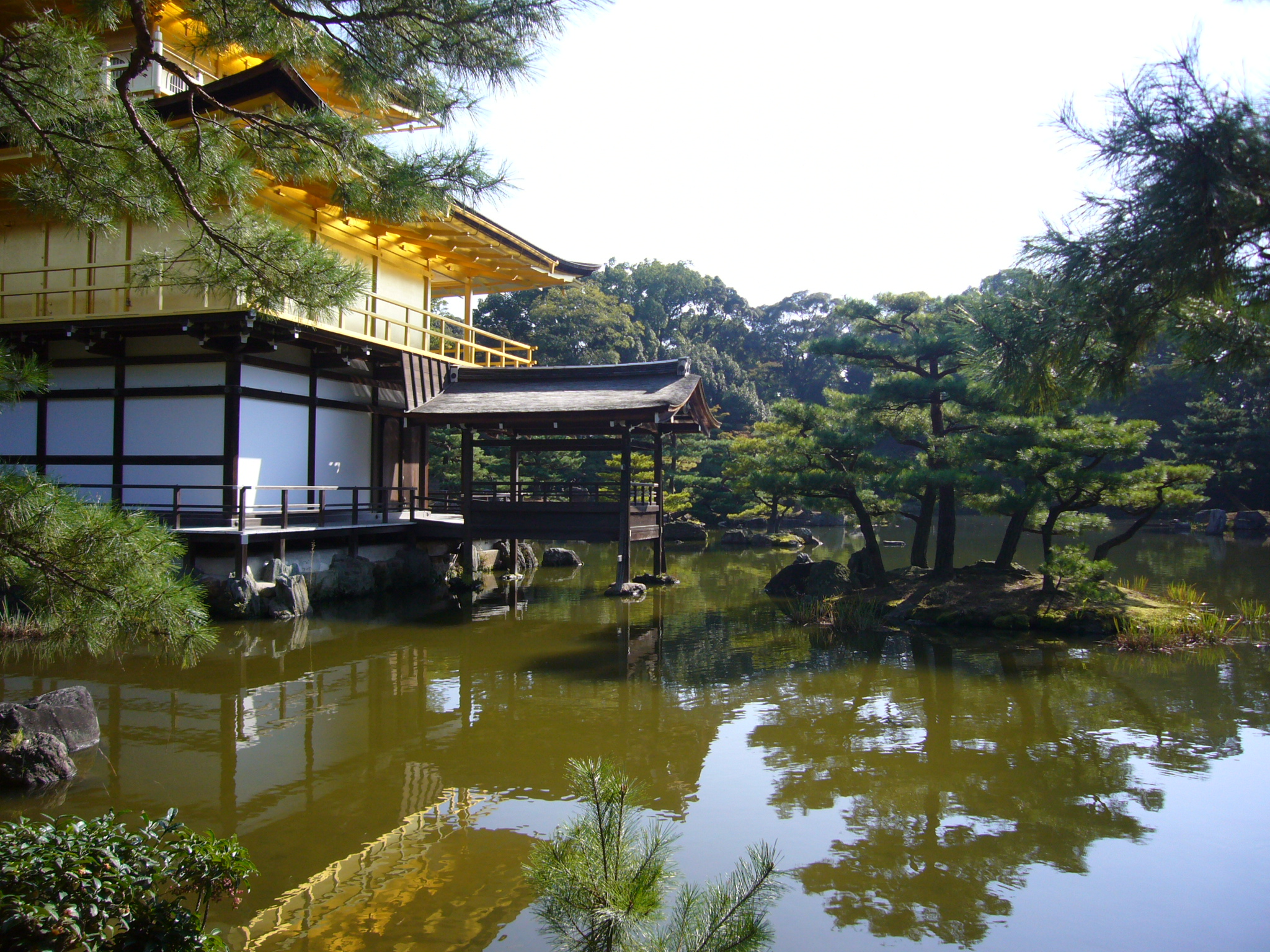
Buddhist temple of Kinkaku-ji, declared a World Heritage Site by UNESCO

From the time Buddhism was introduced to Japan in the 6th century, Buddhism co-existed with an indigenous Japanese religion called Shinto. Many Buddhist temples were built as Japanese princes and emperors began supporting the cause. The first credited with doing so is Prince Shotoku.

Japanese Buddhist temples have roots in traditional Japanese architecture. They typically include a Main Hall (butsuden). A distinctive feature of Japanese temples is the chinjusha, a Shinto shrine devoted to the temple's kami, or deities.

There is a high concentration of important Japanese Buddhist temples in the Kansai region, especially in Nara and Kyoto.

== Thailand ==
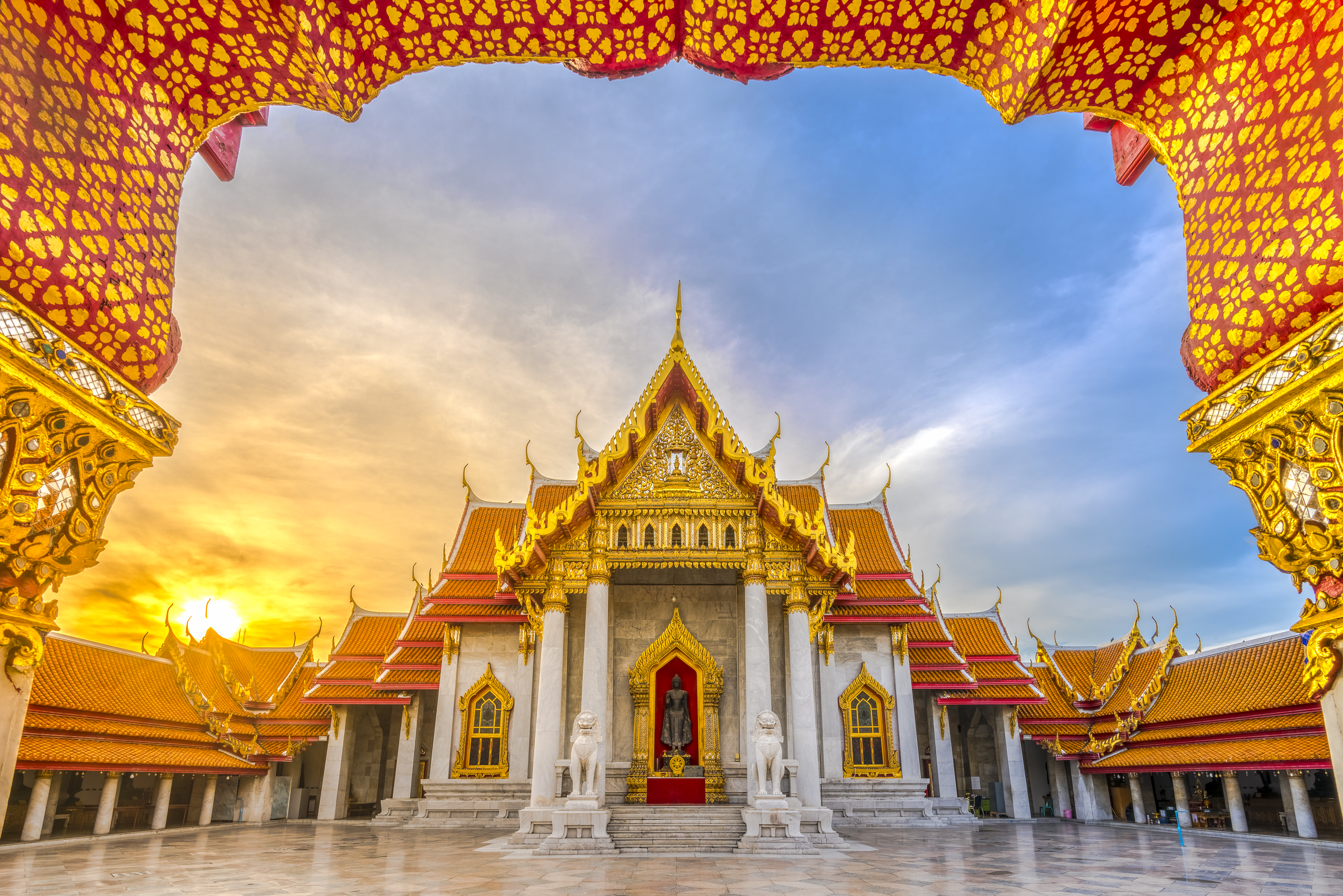
Wat Benchamabophit

Thailand has the largest population of Buddhists in the world. Buddhist temples in Thailand are known as wat, from the Pāḷi vāṭa, meaning "enclosure." A wat, with few exceptions, consists of two parts: the Phutthawat and the Sangkhawat. The Phutthawat (Thai: พุทธาวาส) is the area which is dedicated to Buddha, while the Sangkhawat is the area which is dedicated to Sangha Buddhist monastic community.

== Sri Lanka ==
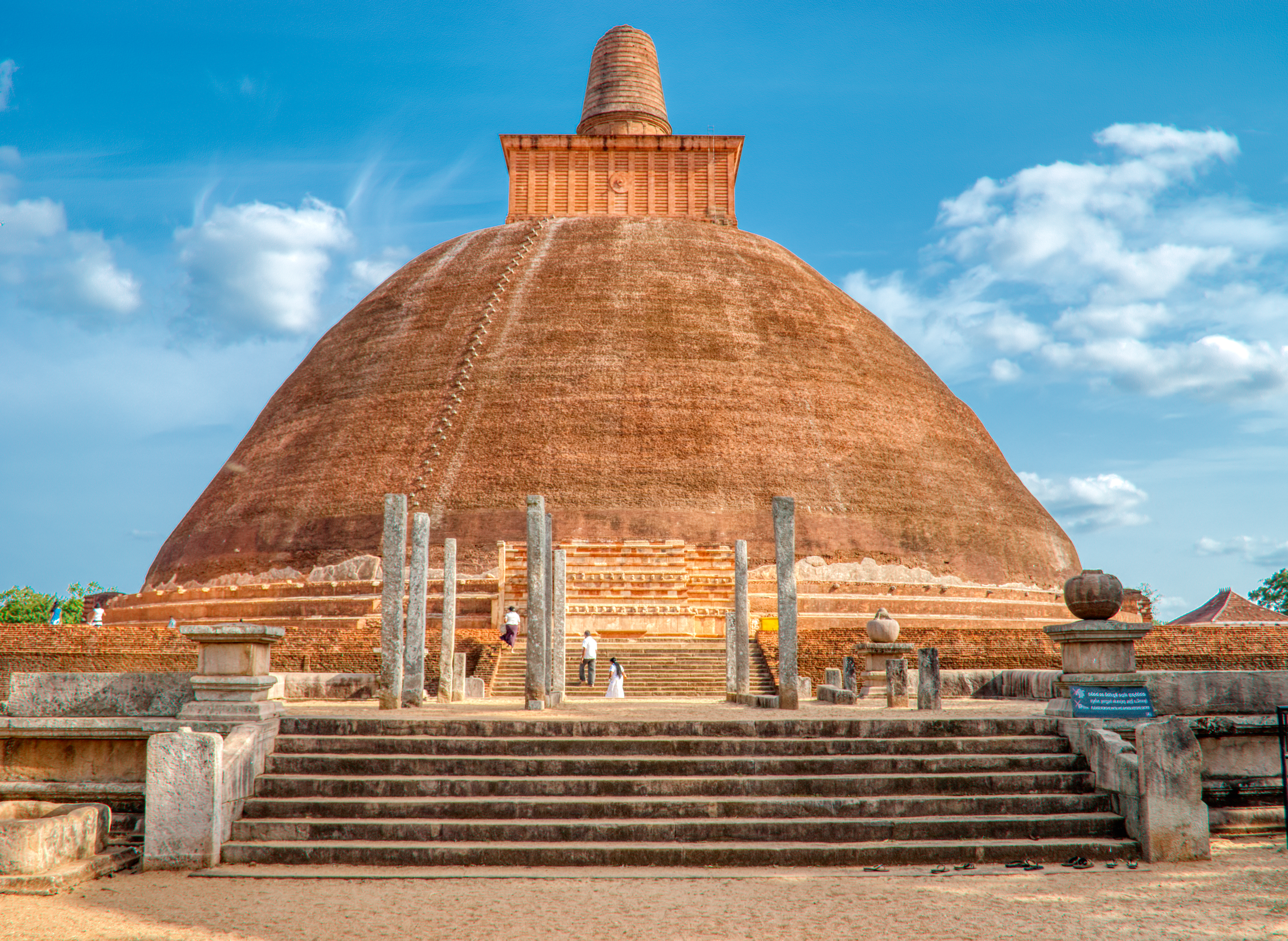
Jetavanaramaya tallest stupa in the ancient world

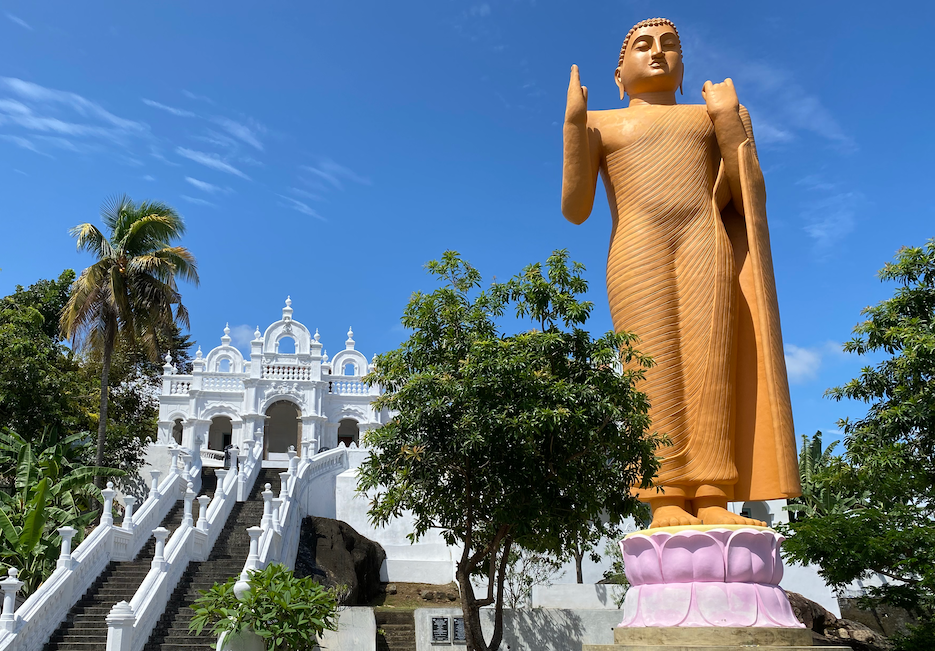
Kumarakanda temple

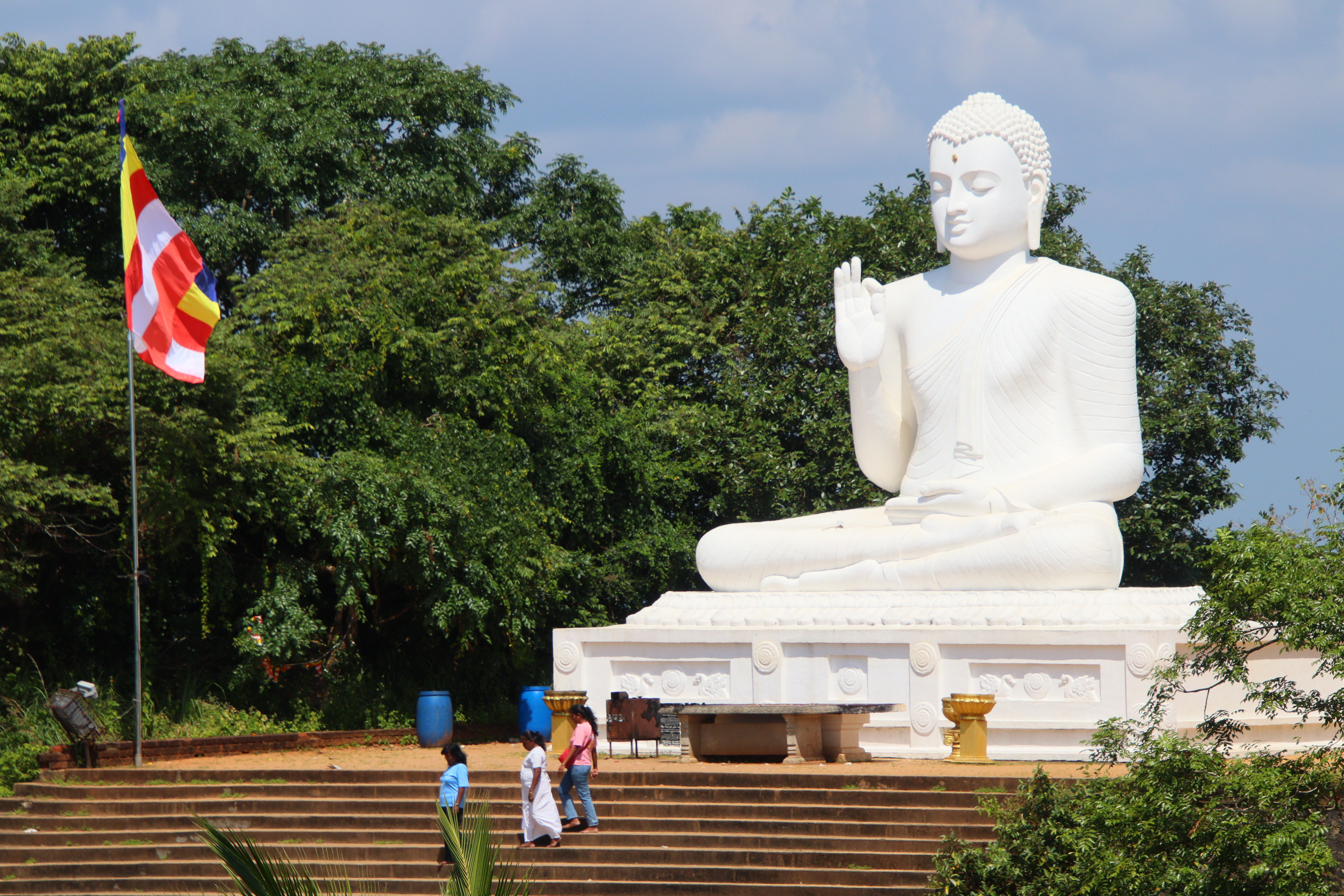
Mihintale Buddha Statue, one of the tallest stupas in the ancient world

Buddhist temples in Sri Lanka are known as 'Pansala' or 'Viharaya' in Sinhalese. Common features in Sri Lankan temples include Stupa, Bo Tree, and Temple Buildings. Sri Lanka has the oldest living human-planted Bodhi Tree in the world, Jaya Sri Maha Bodhi, and some of the largest Stupa in the world including Ruwanwelisaya, Jetavanaramaya and Abhayagiri vihāra.

== Russia ==
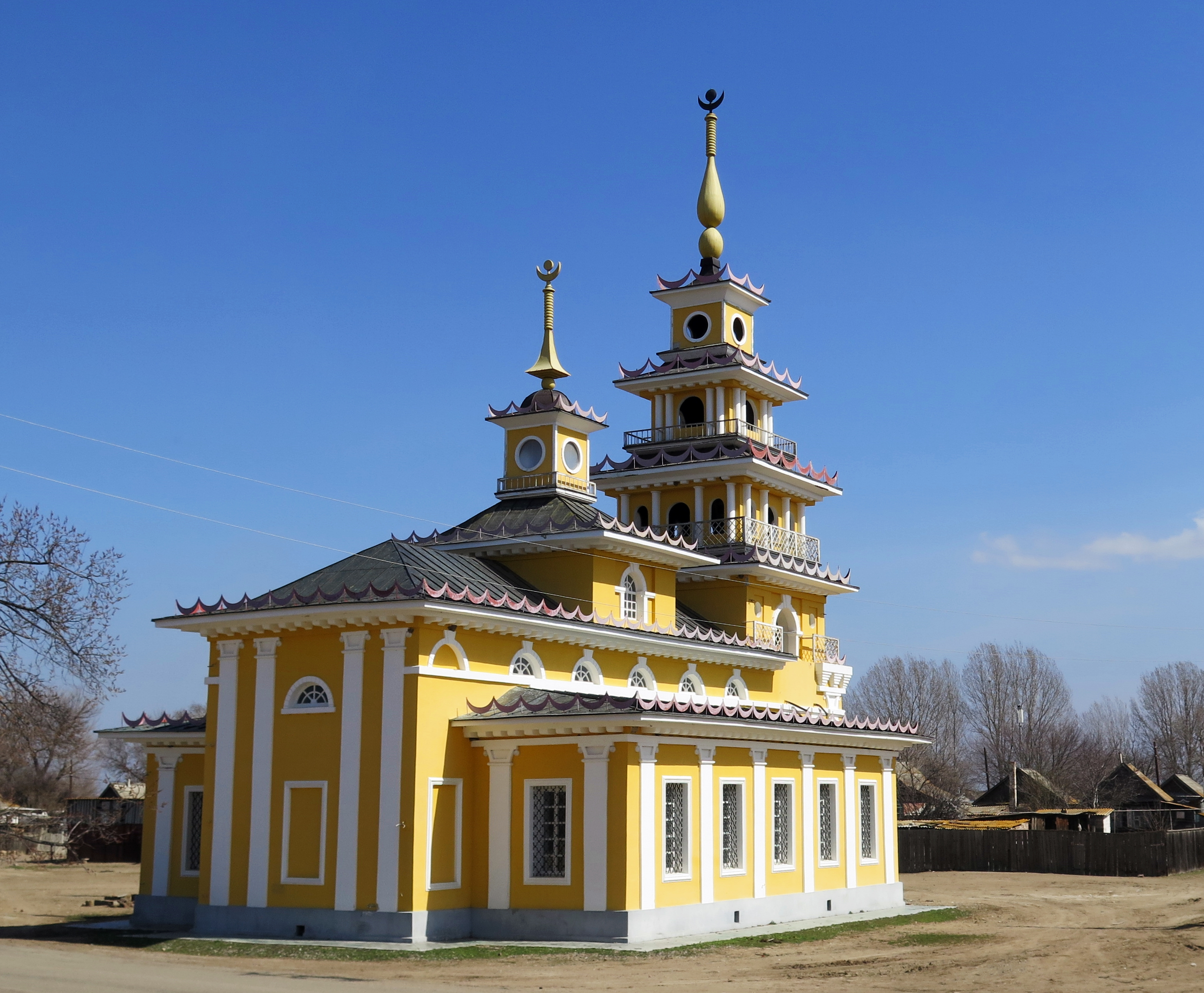
Khosheutovsky khurul (1818)

The first Buryat and Kalmyk such wooden and stone temples as khuruls, dugans and datsans were built with the participation of Russian masons and carpenters, with the influence of the traditions of Russian church architecture. The buildings were cruciform in plan and many-headed. The vestibule is a distinctive feature of the temples in Russia. It is designed to cut off cold air.

Since the second half of the 19th century, temples in plan close to a square have been constructed in the form of a stepped pyramid with a Chinese-type roof with curved corners.

== See also ==
- List of Buddhist temples
- Buddhist architecture – Style of building
- Burmese pagoda – Buddhist stupas in Myanmar
- Cetiya – Objects and places used by Buddhists to remember Buddha
- Dambana – Holy places in Philippine folk religions
- Kyaung – Buddhist monasteries in Myanmar
- Refuge in Buddhism – Initiation ceremony in Buddhism
- Sangha – Pali and Sanskrit word meaning religious community
- Sri Maha Bodhi – Sacred fig tree in Bodh Gaya, Bihar, India
- Uposatha – Buddhist day of observance
- Vihara – Sanskrit and Pāli term for a residence or monastery, usually Buddhist
- Wat – Buddhist or Hindu temple in Asia
