= Kampar Regency =

Regency in Riau, Indonesia

Kampar Regency Kabupaten Kampar
- Regency
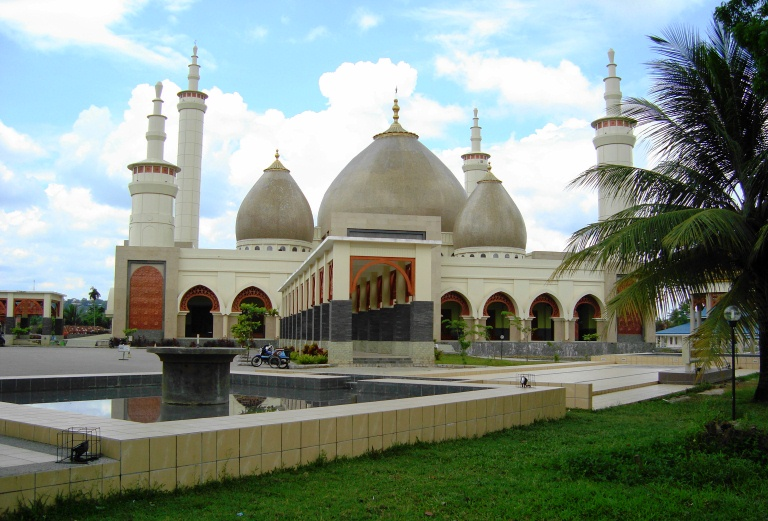
- Islamic Centre of Kampar in Bangkinang town

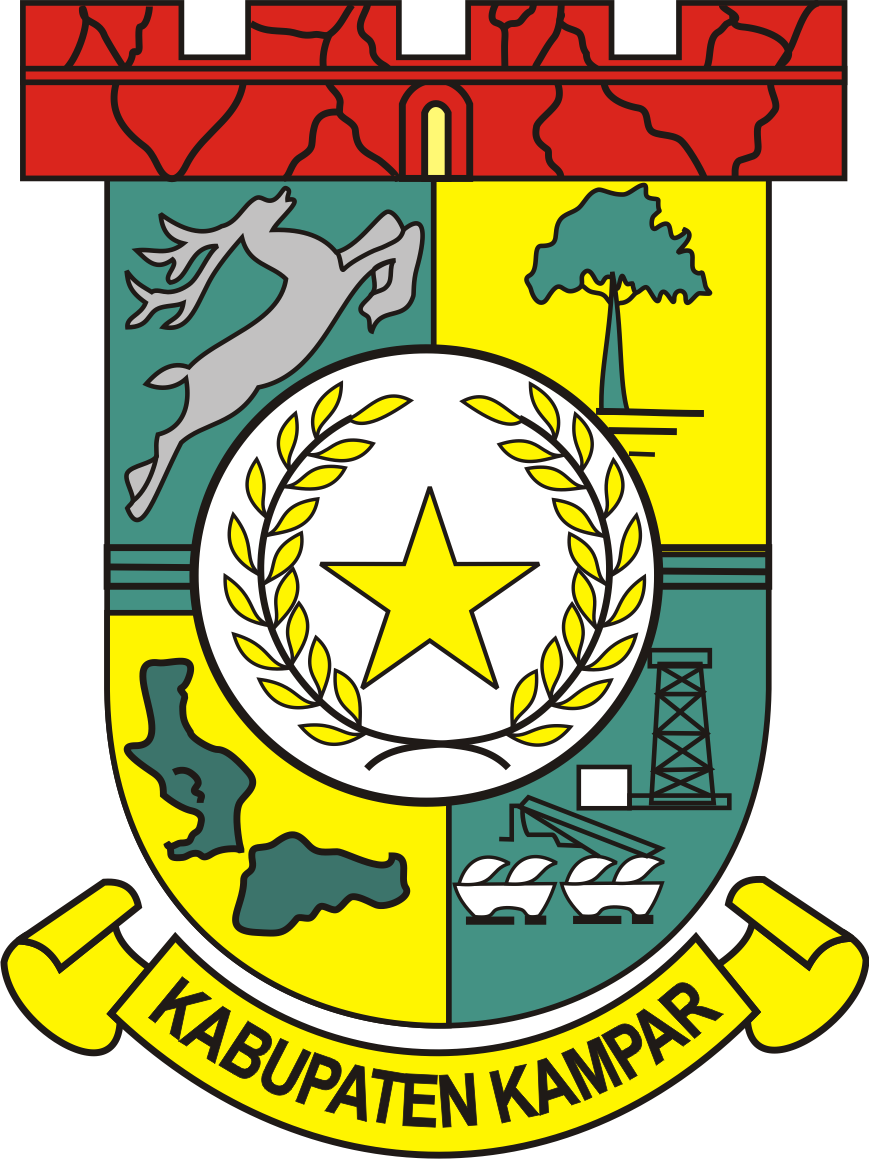
- Coat of arms

- Coordinates: 1°00′40″N 101°14′30″E
- Country: Indonesia
- Province: Riau
- Regency seat: Bangkinang

Government
  - Regent: Ahmad Yuzar
  - Vice Regent: Misharti

Area
  - Total: 11,289.28 km^{2} (4,358.82 sq mi)

Population (mid 2025 estimate)
  - Total: 922,846
  - Density: 81.7453/km^{2} (211.719/sq mi)
- Time zone: UTC+7 (WIB)
- Website: www.kamparkab.go.id

Kampar is a regency (kabupaten) of Riau Province of Indonesia. The regency formerly included a much larger part of Riau Province, but on 4 October 1999 the western districts were split off to form a separate Rokan Hulu Regency, and the eastern districts were split off to form a new Pelalawan Regency. It now has an area of 11,289.28 km^{2} (about 40% of its former area) and had a population of 688,204 at the 2010 Census, and 841,332 at the 2020 Census; the official estimate as at mid 2025 was 922,846 (comprising 470,879 males and 451,967 females). The administrative centre of the regency is located at the town of Bangkinang.

The regency is bordered by:

Heading	Border
North	Bengkalis Regency, Siak Regency and Rokan Hulu Regency
South	Kuantan Singingi Regency
West	Lima Puluh Kota Regency (West Sumatra) and Rokan Hulu Regency
East	Pelalawan Regency and Pekanbaru city

The Kabun and Tandun Districts of Rokan Hulu Regency form a salient into the west side of the Kampar Regency.

== Geography ==
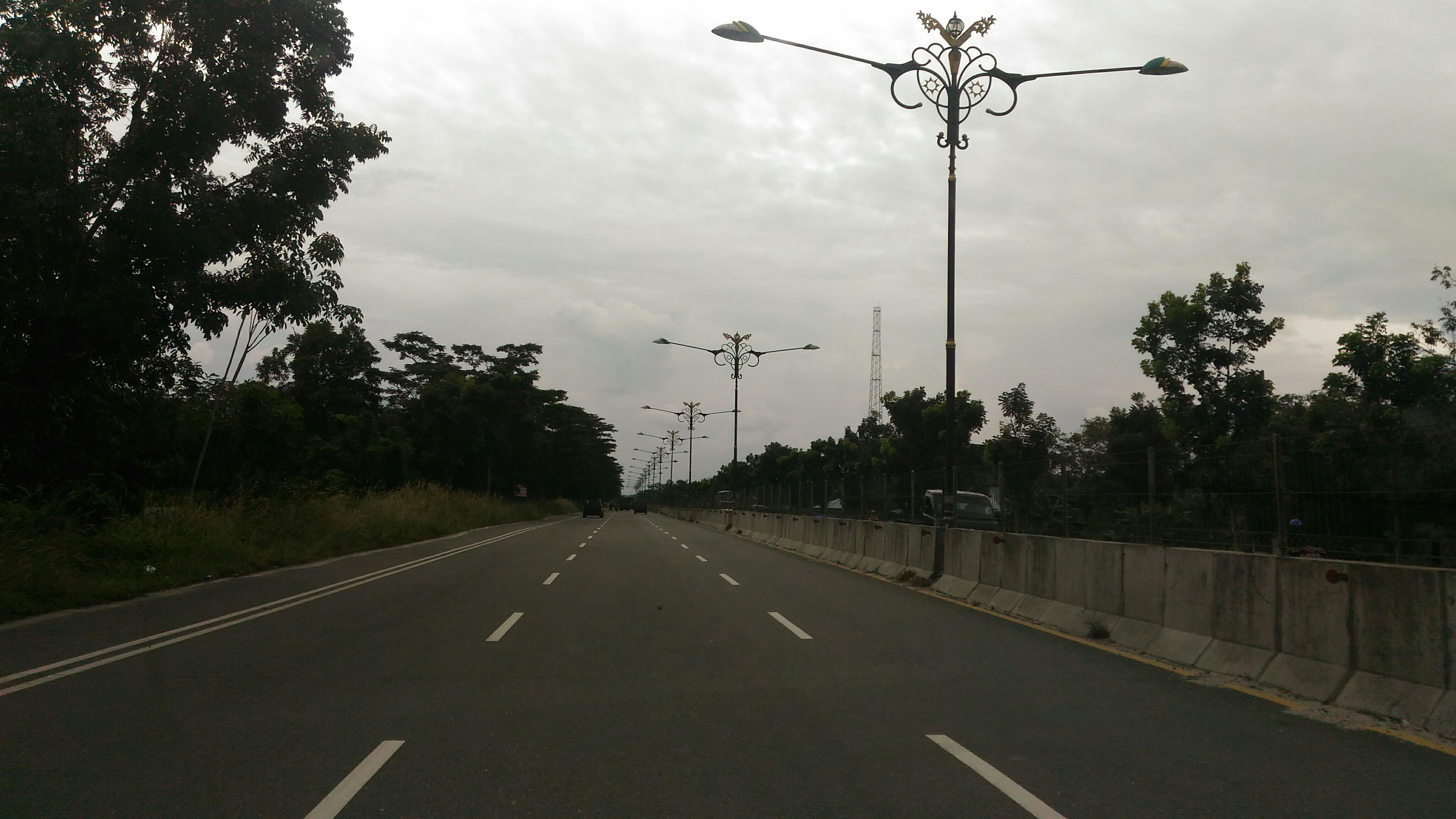
Pekanbaru-Bangkinang Highway Road seen across the regency

The Kampar Regency covers an area of 11,289.28 km^{2}, lying between 1 ° 00'40 "north latitude to 0 ° 27'00" south latitude and 100 ° 28'30 "- 101 ° 14'30" east longitude. The Kampar Regency is traversed by two major rivers and several small rivers. These include the Kampar River about 413.5 km long with an average depth of 7.7 metres and an average width of 143 metres. All parts of the river are included in Kampar Regency, which includes the districts of XIII Koto Kampar, Bangkinang, Kuok (formerly Bangkinang West), Kampar, Siak Hulu, and Kampar Kiri. The other major river is the Siak River's upstream part with a length of about 90 km and an average depth of 8–12 metres across Tapung District. The major rivers located in Kampar Regency are partly still functioning well as a means of transportation, clean water sources, fish farms, as well as a source of electrical energy (hydropower Koto Panjang). Kampar Regency has a generally tropical climate, the minimum temperature occurring in November and December amounting to 21 °C. The maximum temperature occurs in July with a temperature of 35 °C. The number of rainy days in 2009, the vast majority were around Bangkinang Seberang and Kampar Kiri.

== Government ==
Kampar was originally located in the province of Central Sumatra, established pursuant to Law No. 12 of 1956 with the capital Bangkinang. Then it was moved into Riau province, based on the Law on Emergency Number 19 Year 1957 and confirmed by Law No. 61 1958. Subsequently, for the development of the city of Pekanbaru, Kampar local government agreed to give up some of its territory for the purposes of expansion of the city of Pekanbaru, which was then confirmed by the Indonesian Government Regulation Number 19 of 1987.

In accordance with the Decree of the Governor of the province of Riau Number: KPTS. 318VII1987 dated July 17, 1987, Kampar District consisted of 19 districts with two Vice Regent. The Vice Regent of Region I was based in Pasir Pangarayan and the Vice Regent of Region II in Pangkalan Kerinci. The Vice Regent in Region I coordinated the Districts of Rambah, Tandun, Rokan IV Koto, Kunto Darussalam, Fullness, and Tambusai, and the Vice Regent in Region 2 coordinated the Districts of Langgam, Pangkalan Kuras, Bunut and Kuala Kampar, while the other districts are not included in Regions I & II were directly under the Regent. On 4 October 1999 the Regency was officially split into three, with the former Region I becoming established as the new Rokan Hulu Regency, and the former Region II being established as the new Pelalawan Regency. Formerly consisting of 12 and then of 19 districts (kecamatan), a 20th and a 21st district have since been created.

== Administrative districts ==
Kampar Regency is divided into twenty-one districts (kecamatan), as a result of the reorganisation of the previous twelve districts. The districts (with their administrative centres) are tabulated below with their areas and their 2010 and 2020 Census populations, together with the official estimates as at mid 2025. The table also includes the locations of the district administrative centres, the number of administrative villages in each district (a total of 242 rural desa and 8 urban kelurahan), and its post code.

Kode Wilayah	Name of District (kecamatan)	Area in km^{2}	Pop'n 2010 Census	Pop'n 2020 Census	Pop'n mid 2025 Estimate	Admin Centre	No. of villages	Post code
14.01.07	Kampar Kiri	915.33	26,193	32,583	39,663	Lipat Kain	20 ^{(a)}	28472
14.01.09	Kampar Kiri Hulu	1,301.25	10,542	10,972	12,100	Gema	24	28474
14.01.08	Kampar Kiri Hilir	759.74	10,089	12,593	15,861	Sungai Pagar	8 ^{(a)}	28473
14.01.20	Gunung Sahilan	597.97	17,145	20,384	23,429	Gunung Sahilan	9	28471
14.06.19	Kampar Kiri Tengah	330.59	23,590	27,470	30,873	Simalinyang	11	28475
14.01.04	XIII Koto Kampar	732.40	37,811	23,535	26,003	Batu Bersurat	13 ^{(a)}	28454
14.01.21	Koto Kampar Hulu	674.00	^{(b)}	19,717	21,355	Tanjung	6	28453
14.01.05	Kuok ^{(c)}	151.41	22,128	25,897	28,400	Kuok	9	28467
14.01.13	Salo	207.83	22,775	25,802	28,930	Salo	6	28451
14.01.10	Tapung	1,365.97	82,249	101,524	115,506	Petapahan	25	28464
14.01.12	Tapung Hulu	1,169.15	69,473	80,108	87,091	Sinama Nenek	14	28466
14.01.11	Tapung Hilir	1,013.56	52,123	57,769	62,302	Kota Garo	16	28465
14.01.01	Bangkinang Kota	177.18	34,899	37,247	41,214	Bangkinang (town)	4 ^{(d)}	28411: 28412
14.01.15	Bangkinang ^{(e)}	253.50	29,087	33,802	37,652	Muara Uwai	9 ^{(f)}	28463
14.01.02	Kampar	136.28	44,546	51,206	56,858	Air Tiris	18 ^{(a)}	28461
14.01.17	Kampa ^{(g)}	173.08	21,303	23,959	26,513	Kampar (town)	9	28460
14.01.14	Rumbio Jaya	76.92	15,176	18,138	20,301	Teratak	7	28458
14.01.18	Kampar Utara	79.84	15,157	18,057	20,527	Sawah	8	28469
14.01.03	Tambang	371.94	52,634	98,939	102,252	Sungai Pinang	17	28468
14.01.06	Siak Hulu ^{(h)}	689.80	85,881	102,886	103,970	Pangkalan Baru	12	28452
14.01.16	Perhentian Raja	111.54	15,404	18,744	22,046	Pantai Raja	5	28462
	Totals	11,289.28	688,204	841,332	922,846	Pantai Raja	250	

Notes: (a) including one kelurahan (the district administrative centre as named). (b) 2010 population included in that for XIII Koto Kampar, from which it was split.
(c) formerly named Bangkinang Barat. (d) including 2 kelurahan - Bangkinang and Langgini.
(e) also called Bangkinang Seberang. (f) including 2 kelurahan - Pasir Sialang and Pulau. (g) formerly named Kampar Timur.
(h) including the south suburban desa of Pekanbaru city - Kubang Jaya (with 23,163 inhabitants as at mid 2024), Pandau Jaya (25,285), Tanah Merah (13,640) and Desa Baru (13,466).

== Demography ==
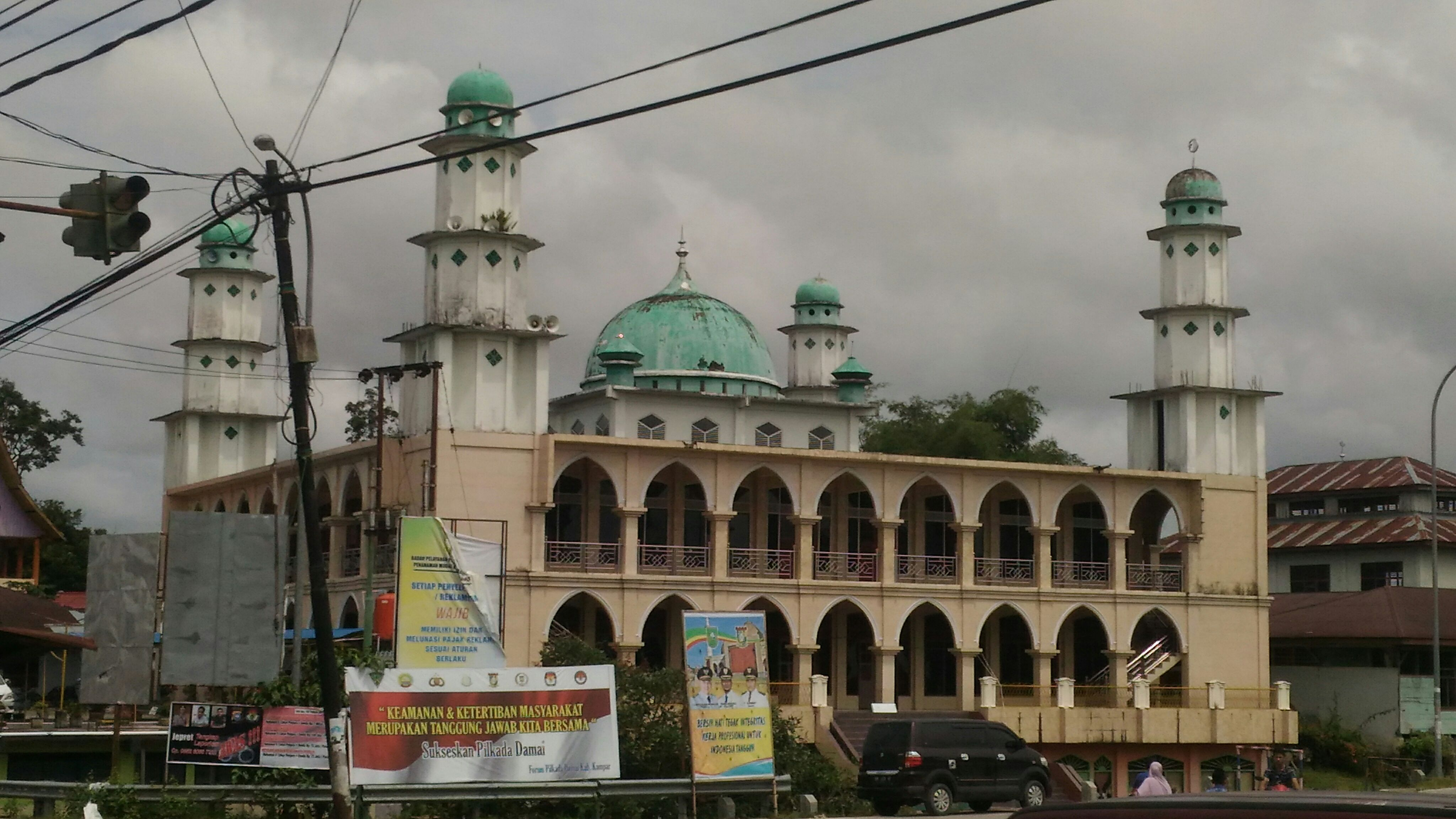
Kampar is the most Islamic regency in Riau

The Census of Kampar Regency in 2010 recorded 688,204 persons, which consisted of 354,836 males and 333,368 females. The Census in 2020 recorded 841,332 persons, which consisted of 431,295 males and 410,037 females. Sex ratio (the ratio of the male population to the female population) thus was 105.2 in 2020. The official estimate in mid 2024 was 898,973 persons, comprising 459,172 males and 439,801 females. The Kampar population are Austronesian who often refer to themselves as Ughang Ocu, spread over most of Kampar region with Tribal Domo, Malay, Piliong / Piliang, Mandailiong, Putopang, Caniago, Kampai, Bendang, etc. In history, ethnicity, customs, and their culture is close to the Minangkabau society, particularly with the Limopuluah Luhak region. This happens because the new Kampar region apart from Minang since the Japanese colonial period in 1942.

According to his H.Takahashi in Japan and Eastern Asia, 1953, the Military Government Kaigun Kampar in Sumatra entered into Shio Riau region as part of a strategy of territorial defense military on the East coast of Sumatra. Furthermore, there are also little ethnic Malays who generally live in the border areas bordering East with Siak and Pelalawan. Followed by ethnic Javanese majority have settled in Kampar since the colonial period and independence through transmigration programs scattered centers of transmigration settlements. Similarly the Batak ethnic population was found in large enough quantities to work as laborers in the plantation sector and other services. Besides the significant number of migrants of other tribes from West Sumatra Minangkabau who made their living as traders and businessmen. The most densely populated district in mid 2024 was Kampar District with 408.75 inhabitants per km^{2}, followed by Tambang District with 262.95 inhabitants per km^{2} and Rumbio Jaya District with 258.31 inhabitants per km^{2}. The three most sparsely populated districts were Kampar Kiri Hulu with a density of only 9.09 inhabitants per km^{2}, Kampar Kiri Hilir with 20.15 inhabitants per km^{2} and Koto Kampar Hulu with 31.25 inhabitants per km^{2}.

== Religion ==
Kampar Regency has a resident Muslim majority, with minorities of Protestants, Catholics, Buddhists, and Hindus. Islam accounts for nearly 90% of total religious adherents throughout the regency. Subsequent Christian religions are the second largest, accounting for 8.6%. Moslems were the highest in Siak Hulu District with as many as 63,511 people in 2010, although in general, all districts in Kampar have a Muslim majority. Jami Mosque of Air Tiris is one of the oldest mosques in Kampar Regency.

== Economy ==
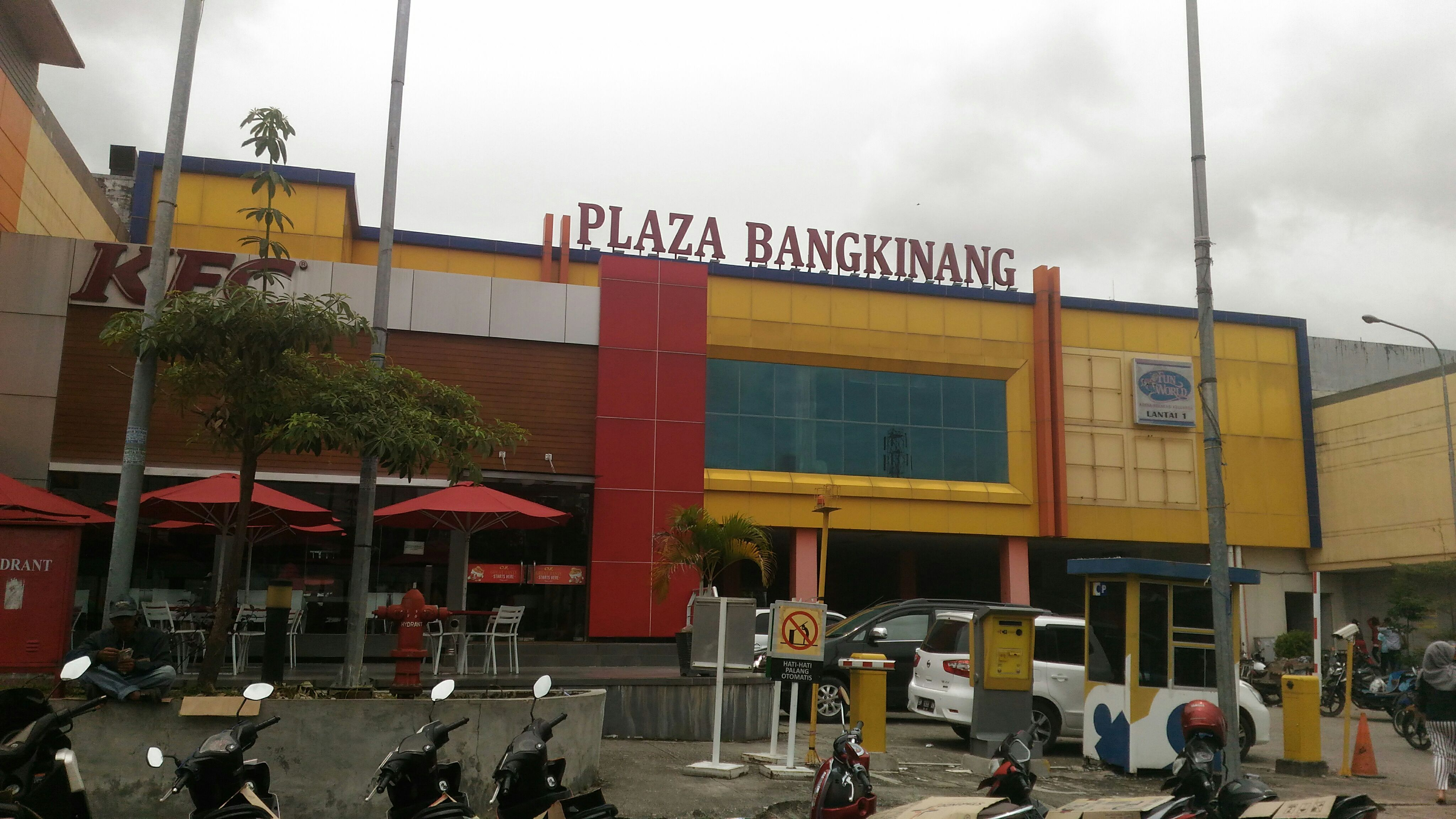
Department store in Bangkinang

Kampar Regency still has a lot of potential that can be exploited, especially in agriculture and aquaculture. Most of the population (67.22%) work in agriculture, plantation and forestry. Only a small fraction (12:22%) were working in the sector of Electricity, Gas and Water, as well as government. As one of the largest area in the province of Riau, Kampar ongoing basis to improve the facilities and infrastructure such as road network (1856.56 km), electricity (72.082 KWH) with 5 units of diesel power plant Hydroelectric Power Plant (HEPP) in Koto length that produces energy with a capacity of 114.240 KWH connected. Other facilities also include telecommunications services (fixed line, mobile phone and internet networks) and water network with a production capacity of 1,532,284 m^{3}. Agriculture Agriculture such as palm oil and rubber, which is one plant that is suitable for land in Kampar regency. Plantation Special plantations for palm oil plantations currently Kampar district has a land area of 241.5 thousand hectares with potential for crude palm oil (CPO) as much as 966 thousand tons. Fishery In the field of aquaculture catfish developed through cages (fish pond in the form of rafts) along the Kampar river, seen the number of cages were lined up neatly along the river kampardan the cooperation between the Government of Kampar PT. Benecom with a total investment of Rp. 30 billion of which in the future will become a center Kampar catfish with a production of 220 tonnes per day.

== Tourism and culture ==
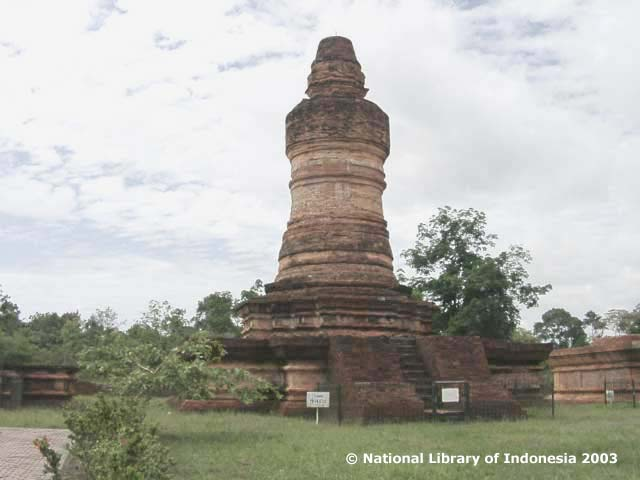
Muara Takus Temple, a famous tourist attraction in Kampar and a cultural heritage

Kampar Regency has an estimated area of archaeological sites have been there during the Srivijaya namely Muara Takus, this region besides being a cultural heritage area is also a religious tourist destination for Buddhists. In addition Kampar Muslim community, still preserve the tradition Balimau Bakasai i.e. shower bath wash in Kampar River particularly welcome the month of Ramadan.

Then there is also the tradition that is the tradition Ma'awuo fish catch fish together (fishing ban) once a year, especially in the area of Lake Bokuok (District of Mine) and Subayang River in the village of Domo (Kampar Kiri Hulu). Kampar culture can not be separated from the influence of Minangkabau, which is identical with the title Limo Koto Kampar and formerly part of Pagaruyung. Limo Koto consists of Kuok, Salo, Bangkinang, Air Tiris and Rumbio. There are many tribal are still preserved to this day, including kinship models of maternal lines (matrilineal). The concept of custom and tradition together with the concept Minang tribe especially in Luhak Limopuluah.

=== Language and Music ===
Colloquially Kampar language is similar to the Minangkabau language, or the so-called language Ocu one variant which is similar to the language used in Luhak Limopuluah. The language is different accent variants Minangkabau language spoken by the people of Luhak Agam, Tanah Datar Luhak Minangkabau and other coastal areas. In addition, Limo Koto Kampar also has some sorts of traditional musical instruments called Calempong and Oguong.
