= Muara Takus =

Buddhist temple complex in Riau, Indonesia

Muara Takus Temple Compound
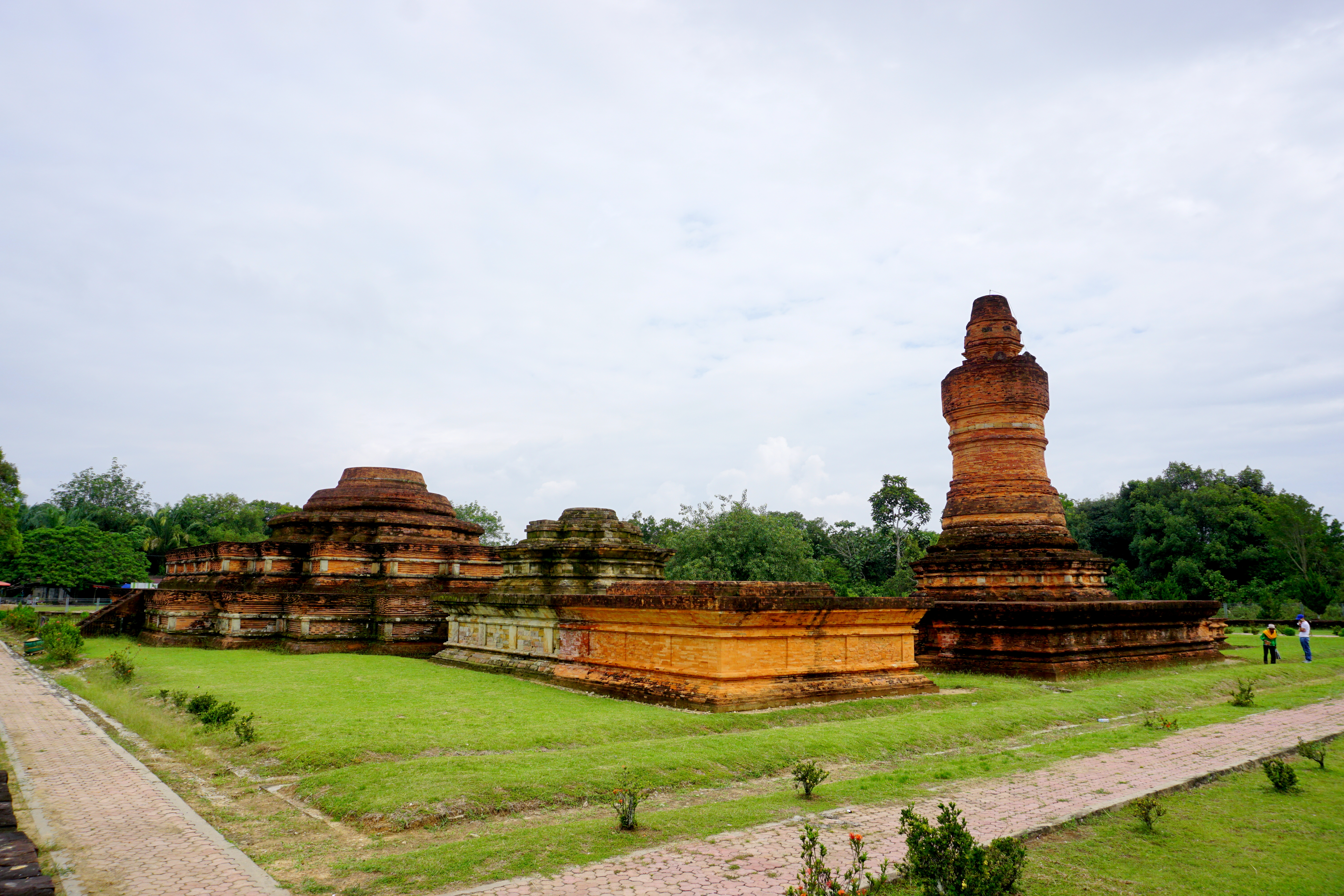
- The Muara Takus temple compound viewed from southwest

- Location within Sumatra Location within Indonesia

General information
- Architectural style: Buddhist candi
- Location: Muara Takus Village, Koto Kampar XIII District, Kampar Regency, Riau, Indonesia
- Coordinates: 0.3364°N 100.6415°E
- Completed: circa 12th century
- Client: Srivijaya

Muara Takus (Indonesian: Candi Muara Takus) is a Buddhist temple complex, thought to belong to the Srivijaya empire. It is situated in Kampar Regency in Riau province, Sumatra, Indonesia. Its surviving temples and other archaeological remains are thought to date to the 11th and 12th century AD. It is one of the largest and best-preserved ancient temple complexes in Sumatra.

== History ==
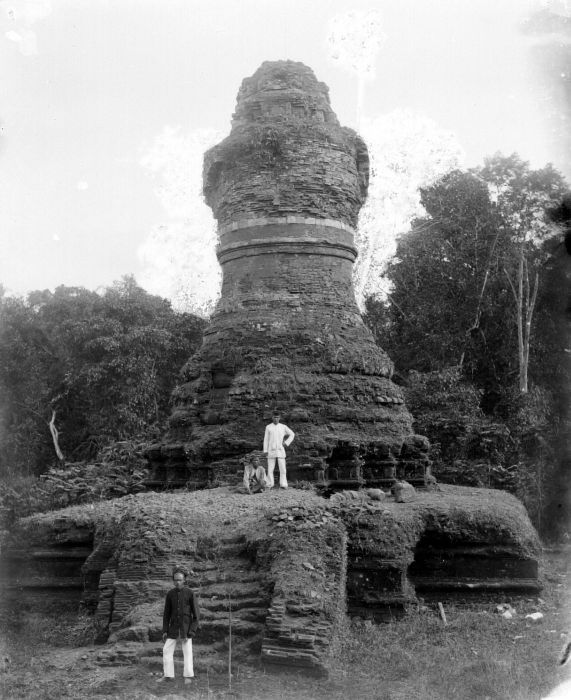
The ruin of Muara Takus stupa in 1933

Candi Muara Takus was constructed by the maritime-based Srivijaya Empire in the eleventh century. The architecture and design of the temples clearly indicate their Mahayana Buddhist origin. It has been suggested by Schnitger that the major temples at Muara Takus may have undergone major renovations in the twelfth century. It is thought that the area was used as both a religious and trade centre by Srivijaya.

The site was abandoned for many centuries before it was rediscovered by Cornet De Groot in 1860. The site was explored and surveyed by W.P Groenveld in 1880 and excavations have been conducted periodically since. The research on the Muara Takus archaeological site was carried out in 1983 and it resulted in mapping of the ancient embankment remnants, the Mahligai Temple compound, and other ancient structures. The site is now protected as a national monument.

== Design and decoration ==
The temple complex of Candi Muara Takus is surrounded by a 1 metre tall stone perimeter wall that measures 74 x 74 metres. The outer wall is penetrated by a gateway on the northern side. Within the walls are the remains of four substantial Buddhist temples (candi). The most unusual of these is Candi Mahligai. This lotus-shaped Buddhist stupa is unique in Indonesia though there are numerous similar ancient structures in Thailand and Myanmar. This structure is founded on an octagonal base and reaches a height of 14.30 metres. The uppermost level of the stupa is decorated with lion figures that are barely discernible from below.

On the east side of Candi Mahligai is the base of Candi Palangka. It is constructed from red stone and now only reaches a height of 1.45 metres. It was reportedly much taller at the time of the earliest colonial expeditions to the site but the upper terraces have long since collapsed. A third structure within the complex is Candi Bungsu. The most striking thing about this temple is that it was built from two very different kinds of stone. One part is built from red stone and the other section from sandstone. This temple now reaches a height of 6.20 metres. The largest structure at Candi Muara Takus is Candi Tua. Its base measures 32.80 metres x 21.80 metres and it reaches a height of 8.50 metres. This temple is terraced and it bears some resemblance in its design to the much larger stupa, Candi Borobudur, in Java. Like all the temples at Candi Muara Takus, Candi Tua features only minimal decoration. The most notable decorative feature are the seated lion figures on the upper terraces.

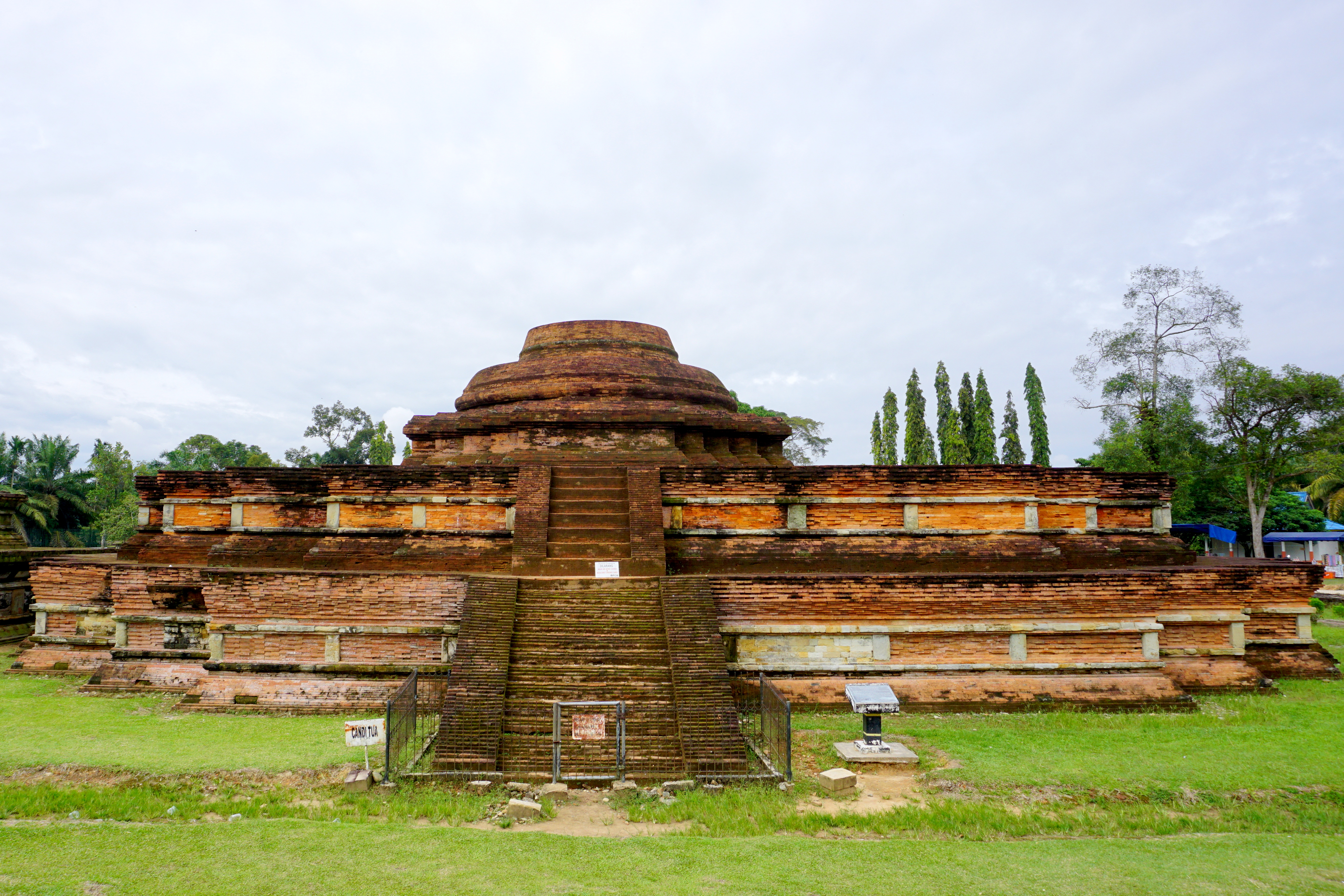
Candi Tua, the main temple is a stepped stupa

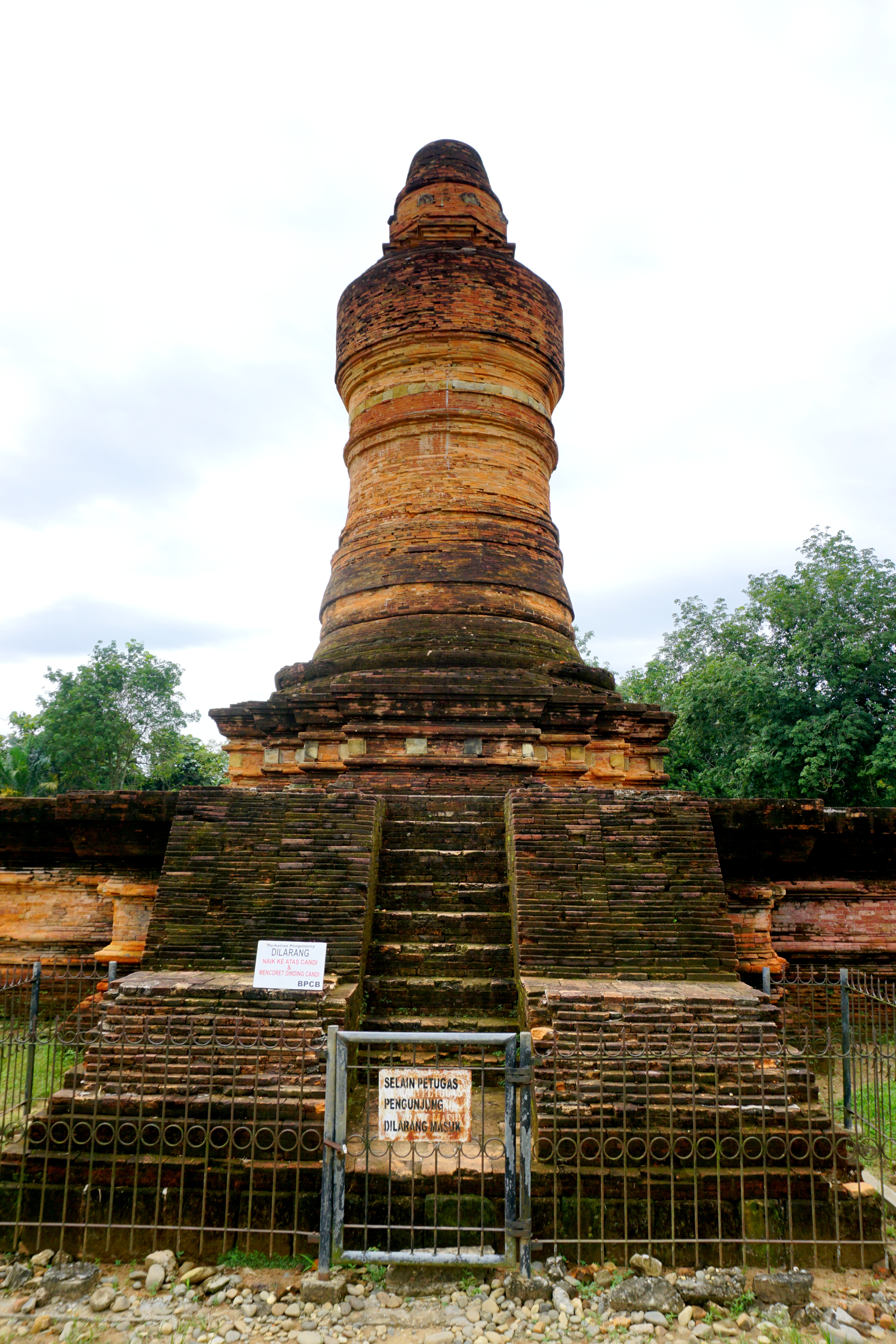
Candi Mahligai, the tallest stupa

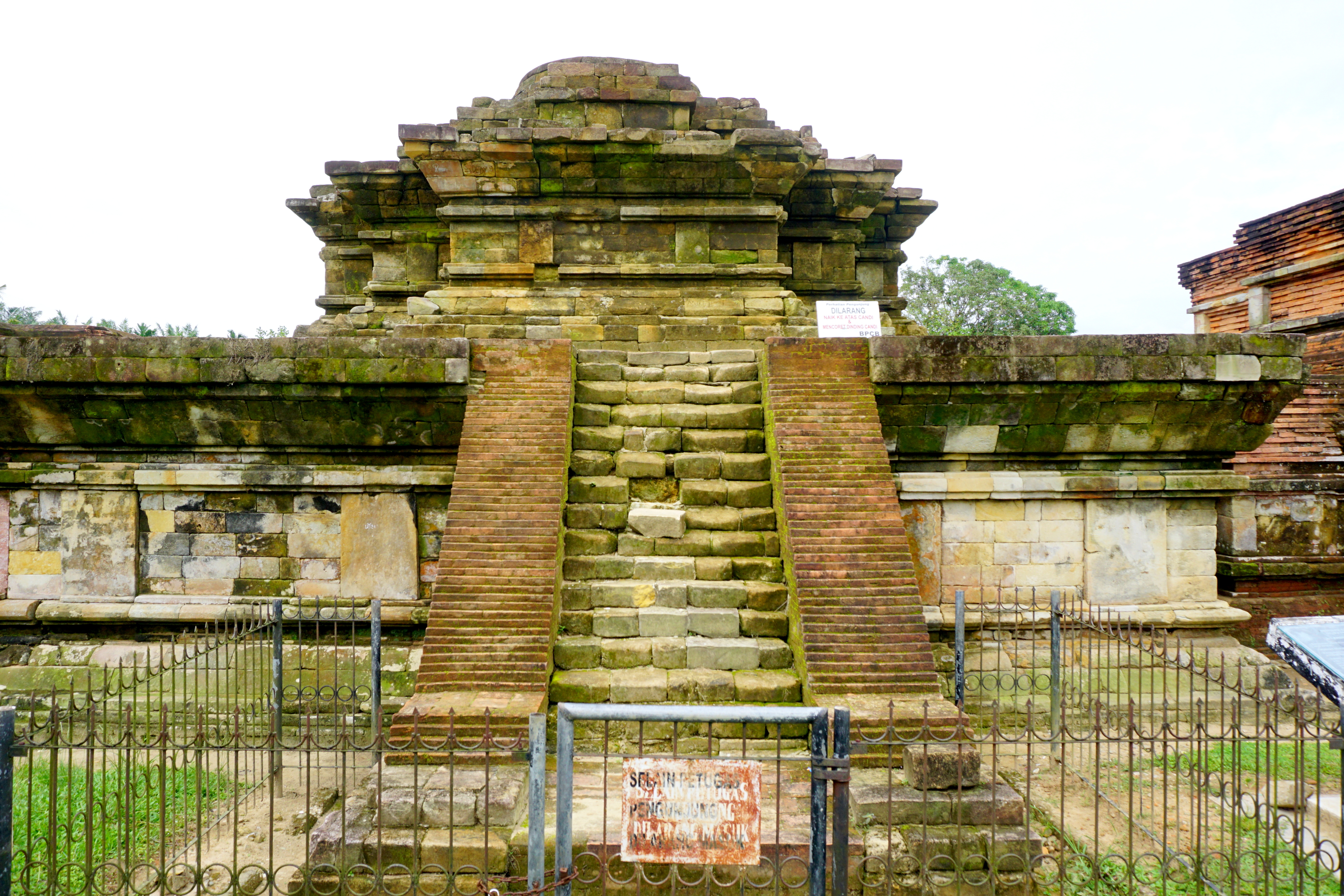
Candi Bungsu

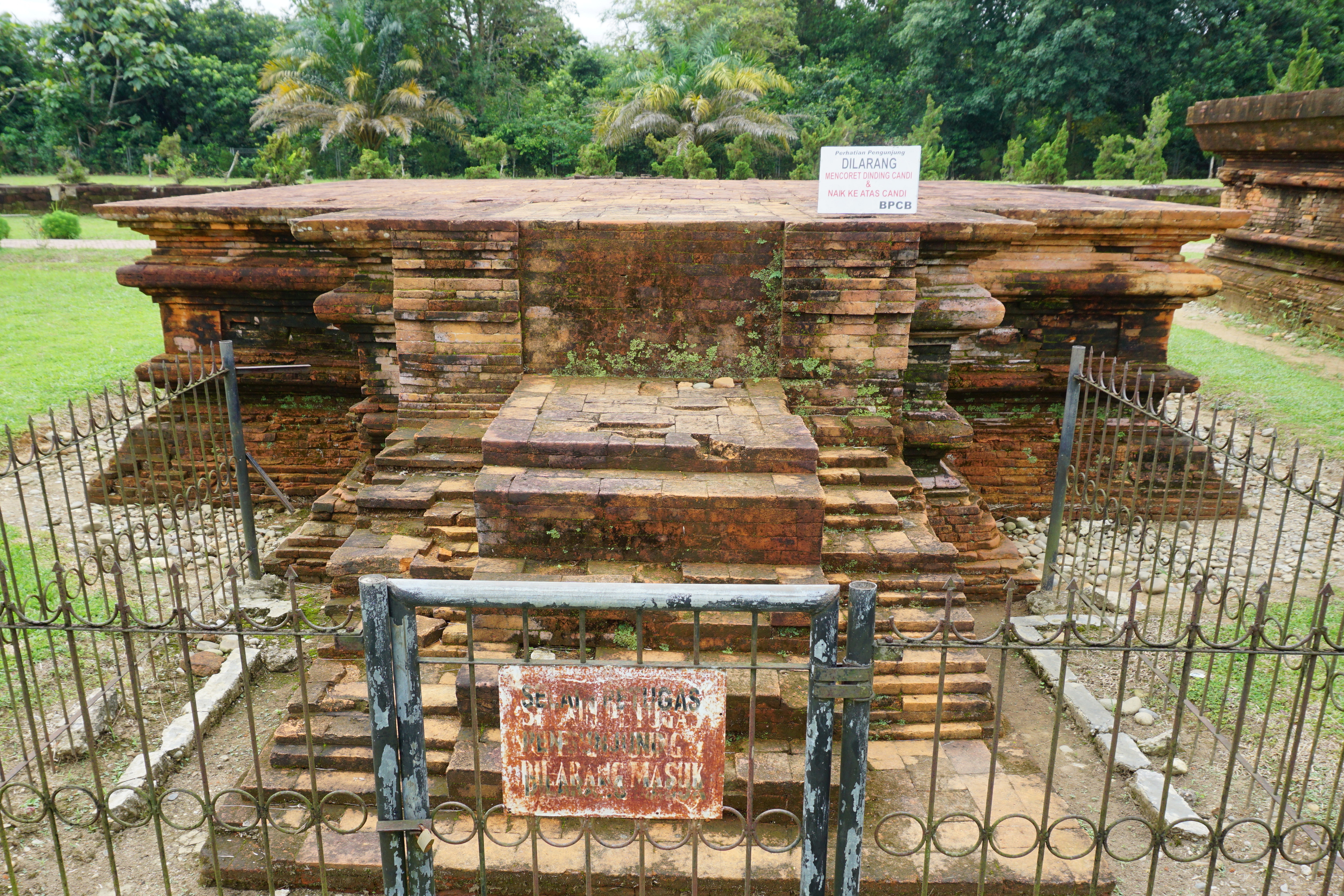
Candi Palangka

== See also ==
- Buddhism in Indonesia
- Candi of Indonesia
- Indonesian Esoteric Buddhism
- Indonesian architecture
- Bujang Valley, Malaysia

== Bibliography ==
- Gugusan Dan Sejarah Candi Muara Takus (in Indonesian). Department of Education and Culture, Riau Province. November 1992.
- Schnitger, F M (1989). Forgotten Kingdoms in Sumatra. Oxford University Press.
