= Badut Temple =

Hindu temple in East Java, Indonesia

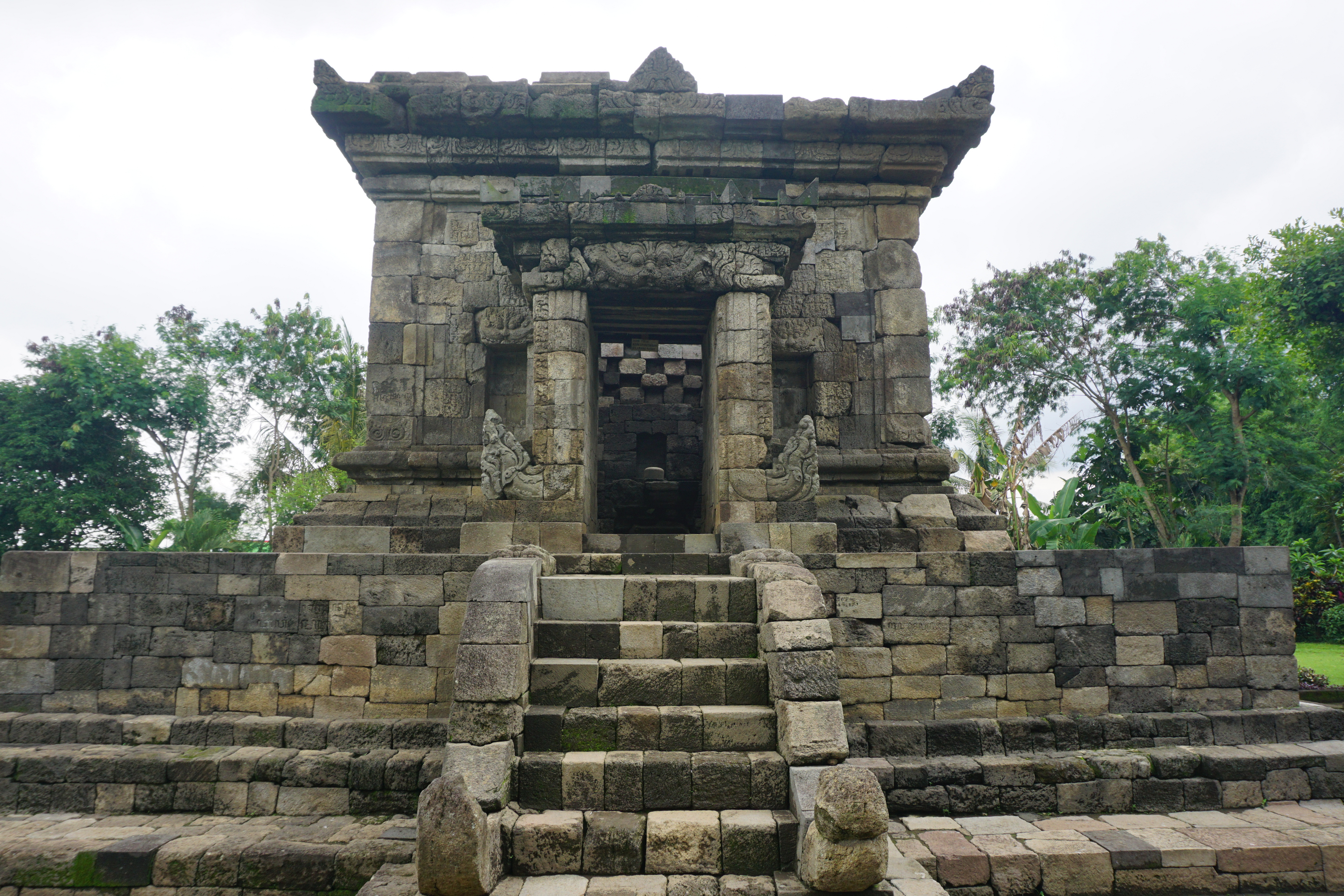
- Badut temple from front

- Location within Java Location within Indonesia

General information
- Architectural style: Candi
- Location: Malang, East Java, Indonesia
- Coordinates: 7.957778°S 112.598333°E
- Completed: c. 760

Badut Temple (Indonesian: Candi Badut) is an 8th-century Hindu temple (candi) located in Tidar area around 5 kilometres (3 mi) west from the center of Malang city. This andesite stone structure is located in Karang Besuki village, Dau subdistrict, Malang Regency, East Java Indonesia.

Despite its location in East Java, unlike other temples near Malang — such as Singosari and Kidal Temple, this temple follows the older Candi style of Central Java. Estimated was built in 760 CE making this temple the oldest temple in East Java.

== Etymology ==
Popular beliefs connected the name "Badut" with Indonesian and Javanese term which means "clown". However, the name "Badut" suggested was derived from Sanskrit term Bha-dyut which refer to Canopus star or known as Agastya star.

== History ==
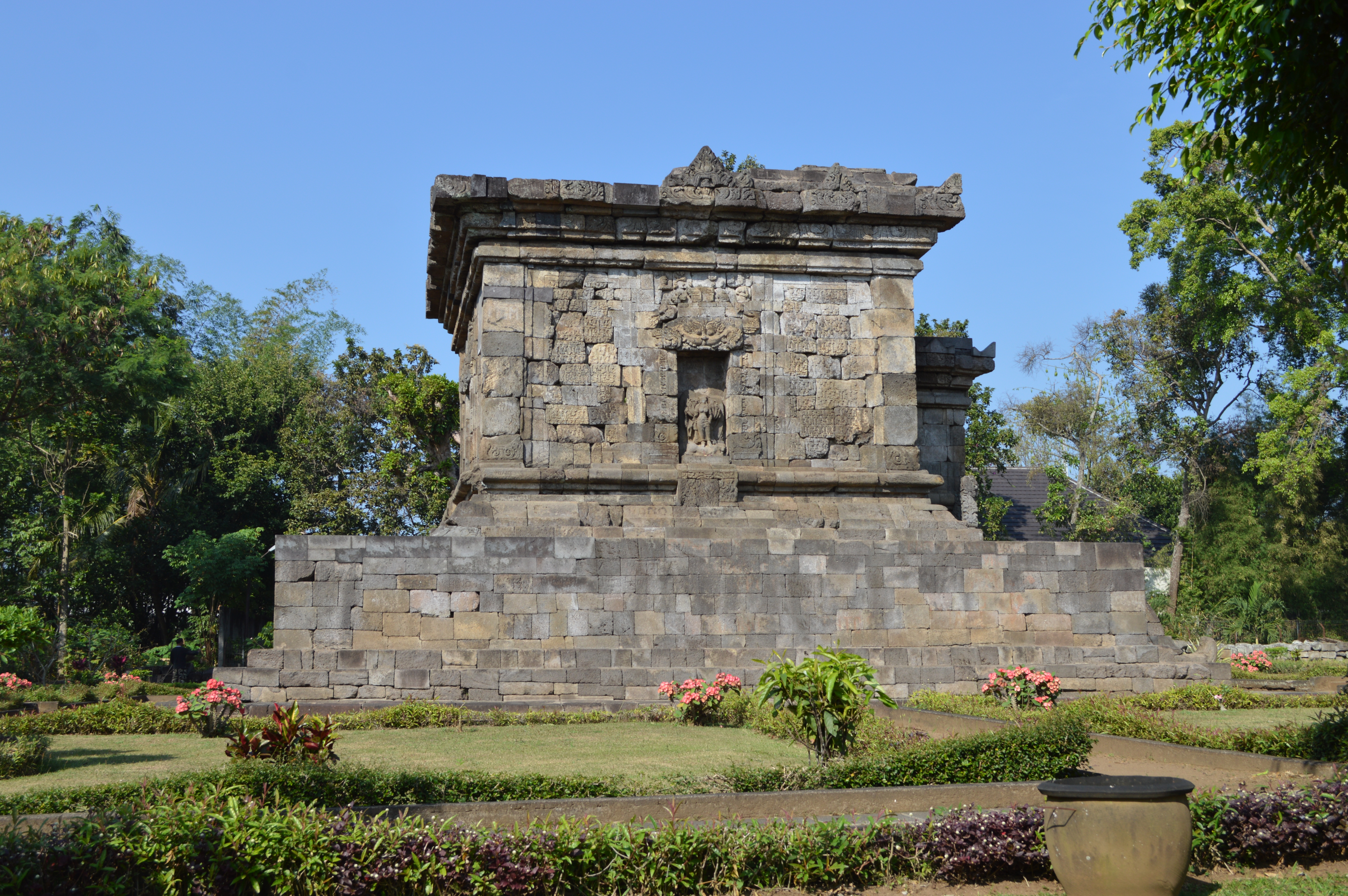
Badut temple viewed from Northeast.

Indonesian historian Purbatjaraka connected this temple with an inscription discovered in Merjosari village, the Dinoyo inscription. This inscription was written in Sanskrit using old Javanese script with chandrasengkala (chronogram): nayana vayu ras which corresponds to the year 682 Saka or 760 CE, mentioning about King Gajayana the ruler of Kanjuruhan Kingdom. However, the temple connection with Dinoyo inscription is still in discussion among historians, due to lack of strong connection between the inscription and the temple.

This temple ruin was discovered in 1921 in the form of a mound of stone and soil. The first person to report the existence of the Badut temple was Maureen Brecher, a Dutch controller who worked in Malang. The Badut Temple was restored in 1925–1926 under the supervision of B. De Haan from the Archaeological Service of the Dutch East Indies. From the results of the excavations carried out at that time it was known that the temple building had completely collapsed, except for the foot parts which still intact.

== Structure ==
The temple facing west-northwest, and in front of the temple there was a remnant of three perwara or smaller complementary shrines. The temple compound were once surrounded by a rectangular stone fence measuring 11 m × 11 m (36 ft × 36 ft). The actual height of the wall is unknown since the remnant was only the fence base. The uniqueness of this temple is its simple base or foot part; a two-metre (6 ft 7 in) tall rectangular plain pedestal without any seams or any decoration at all.

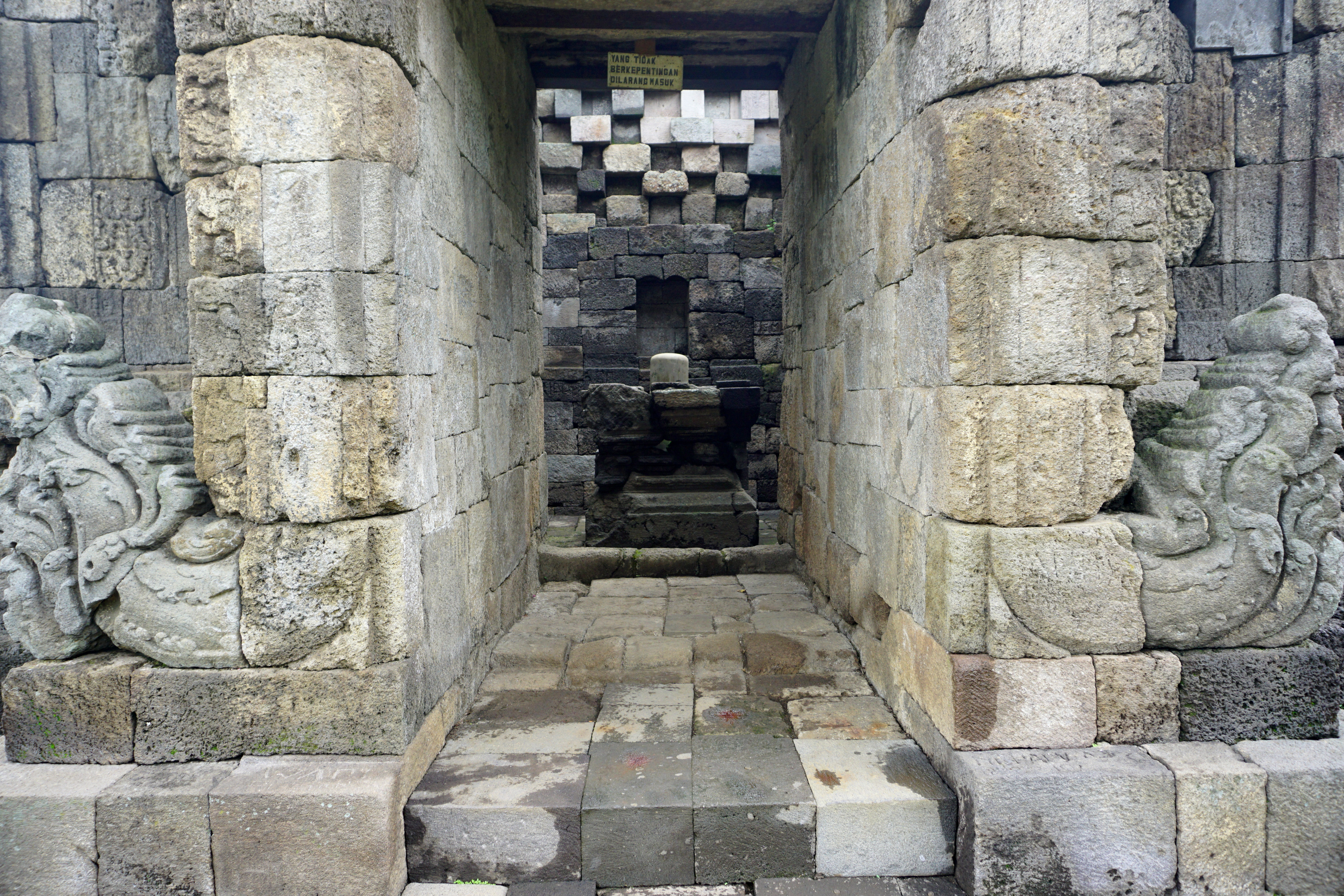
Kala-makara portal led to garba griha containing lingam and yoni, a symbol of Shiva.

The stairs are located on the west side, right in front of the entrance to the main room. On the outside of the wall flanking the stairs are carvings that are no longer intact, but there are still floral motifs that surround the figure of a person blowing a flute. The entrance to the garba griha (inner sanctum) is equipped with protruding room about 1.5 m (4 ft 11 in). The entrance is quite wide with kala-makara decoration above the portal.

The garba griha is a room of about 5.53 m × 3.67 m (18.1 ft × 12.0 ft). In the middle of the room there is a lingam and yoni, which is a symbol of Shiva and also a symbol of fertility. On the wall around the room there are small niches that seems once contain statues of Hindu deities.

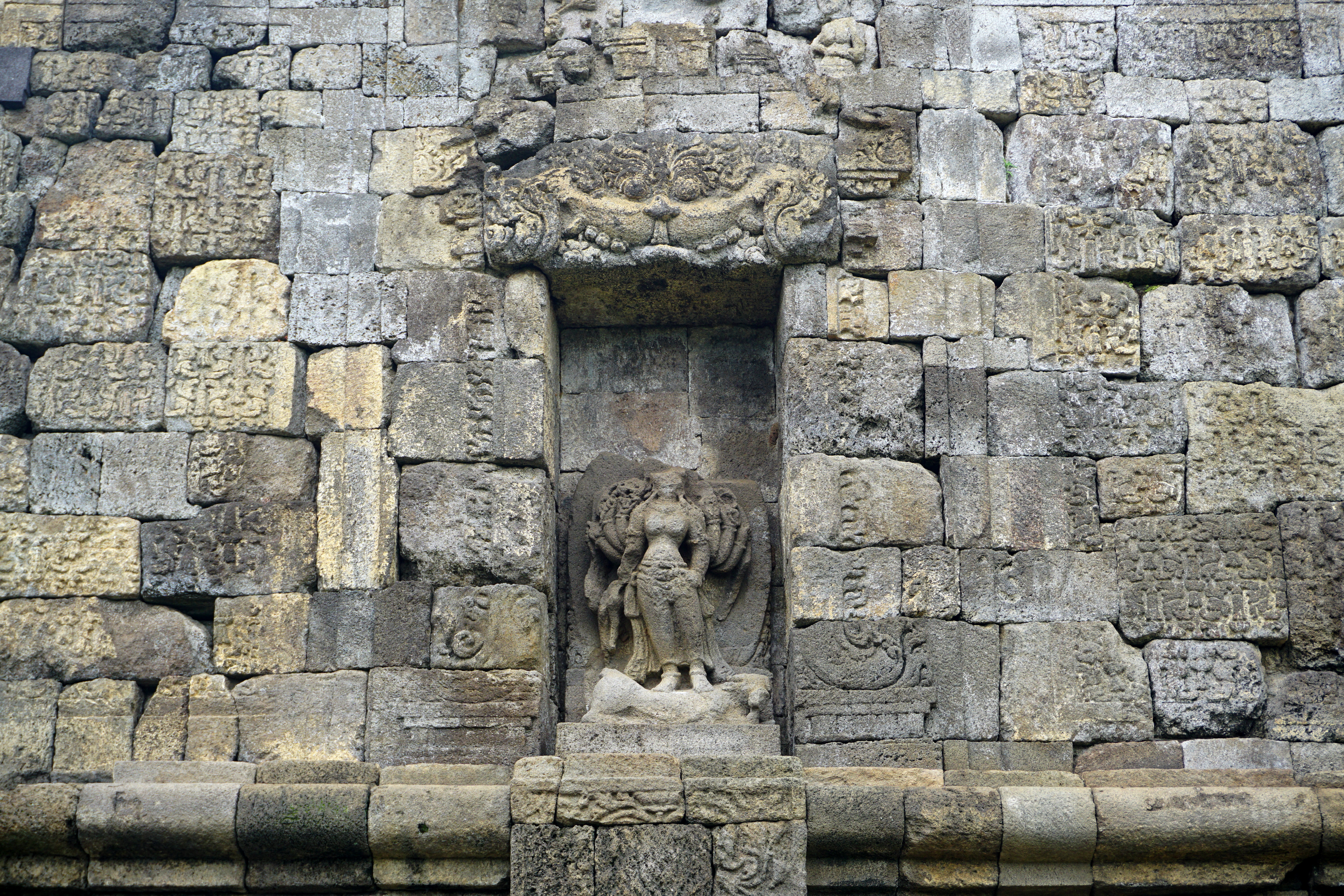
North niche contain a statue of Durga Mahisasuramardini.

According to examples of contemporaneously similar Javanese Hindu temples layout, such as Sambisari, Gebang and Merak; the two niches to the right and left of the door should contain the Mahakala and Nandishwara statues, the north niche host the Durga Mahisasuramardini statue, the eastern reserved for the Ganesha statue, and at the southern side there are the niches for the statue Agastya. However, among all those statues of Hindu pantheon, only Durga Mahisasuramardini statue remain in Badut temple, while the rest is missing.

Just like common structure of Javanese Hindu temple of the period, the temple is arranged in three parts; the foot which is the base pedestal and stairs; the body which is the portal leading to a main room with walls surrounding it, and the head which usually took form of a tiered pyramidal roof structure. Currently, only the base and the body parts of the temple remains, while the roof structure is missing, due to the lack of stone parts of the roof remains to be reconstructed.

== See also ==
- Singhasari temple
- Kidal Temple
- Jago Temple
- Sumberawan
- Jawi Temple
- Trowulan
- Pari Temple
- Gunung Gangsir
- Jabung
