= Sitopayan I inscription =

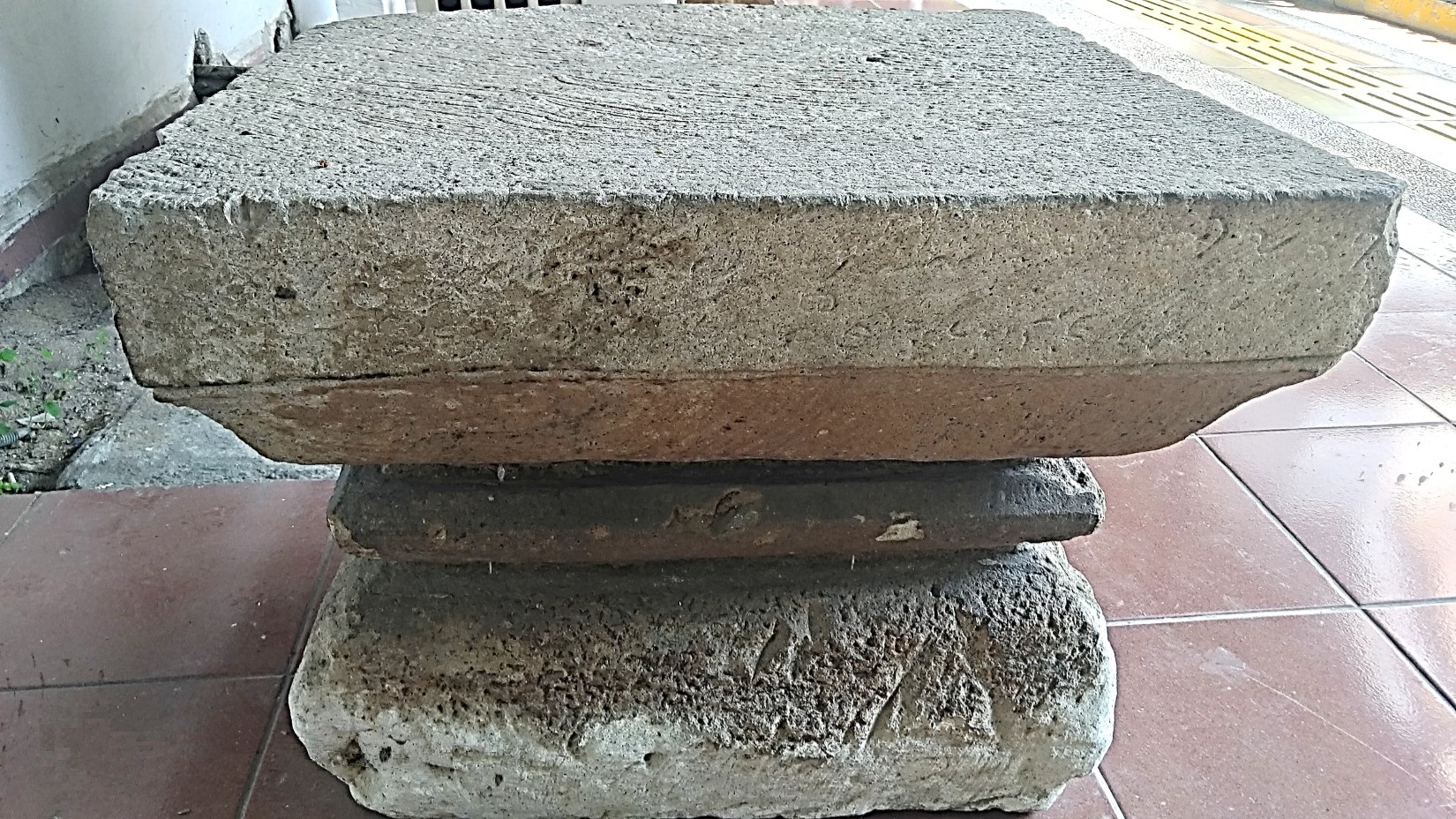
Sitopayan I inscription. Collection of the North Sumatra State Museum.

Sitopayan I inscription is an inscription written in a mixed of Old Malay and Old Batak languages, written mostly using Kawi script with some words using Old Batak script. The inscription was found at the Biaro (temple) Si Topayan, in Sitopayan village, Portibi District, North Padang Lawas Regency, North Sumatra Province, Indonesia. The inscription is quite short, it is written on one of the horizontal sides of a base of a stone idol. F.D.K. Bosch thought that this inscription was made in the 13th century CE, based on the shape and characteristics of the script.

The inscription mentioned three people named Hang Tahi, Si Rangit, and Kabayin Pu Anyawari who made an idol house. The use of two languages, namely Old Malay and Old Batak, raises the notion that the community around the area was bilingual. In addition, the mentioning of three articles Hang, Si, and Pu (Mpu) in the people names (Tahi, Ranggit, and Kabayin Anyawari) also reflects the characteristic habit of a Malay speaking people.

Currently, the inscription is stored in the North Sumatra State Museum, with the inventory number 1517.1.

== Text ==
This inscription text according to Bosch (1930) is as follows:

1. tat kāla Hang Tahi Si Ranggit
2. Kaba(ga)yin Pwanyawāri babwat bagas
3. brahala sātap

== Translation ==
The translation of this inscription is as follows:

1. At that time, Hang Tahi, Si Ranggit, (and)
2. Kabayin Pu Anyawari makes a
3. home for the gods, under one roof

== See also ==
- Bahal temple, related temple in the same area
- Sitopayan II inscription
