= Sitopayan II inscription =

Sitopayan II inscription is an inscription written in Proto Batak language and using Old Batak characters. The inscription was found at the Biaro (temple) Si Topayan, in Sitopayan village, Portibi District, North Padang Lawas Regency, North Sumatra Province, Indonesia. The inscription consists of two short lines, written on a horizontal side of the base of a stone idol. F.D.K. Bosch thought that this inscription was made in the 13th century CE, based on the shape and characteristics of the script.

The inscription mentioned four people who built a vihara for a king, whose names were Pu Sapta, Hang Buddhi, Sang Imba, and Hang Langgar. The mentioning of three articles Hang, Sang, and Pu (Mpu) in the people names also reflects the characteristic habit of a Malay speaking people.

Researcher Robert von Heine Geldern suspected that the writing on this inscription is a form of early Batak script. The writing is considered the earliest example of Batak writing, and may have a close relationship with the writings of the people in the interior of Sumatran mountains. Goris (1930) also speculated that the names of Sapta, Buddhi, Imba, and Langgar might be a chandrasangkala (chronogram), representing the numbers 7, 5, 1, and 1, which rises the suspicion that the Si Topayan temple and its surrounding area were built in 1157 Saka (1235 CE).

Currently, the inscription is stored in the North Sumatra State Museum, with the inventory number 1517.2.

== See also ==
- Sitopayan I inscription
- Bahal temple
