= Merak Temple =

Hindu temple in Indonesia

Candi Merak
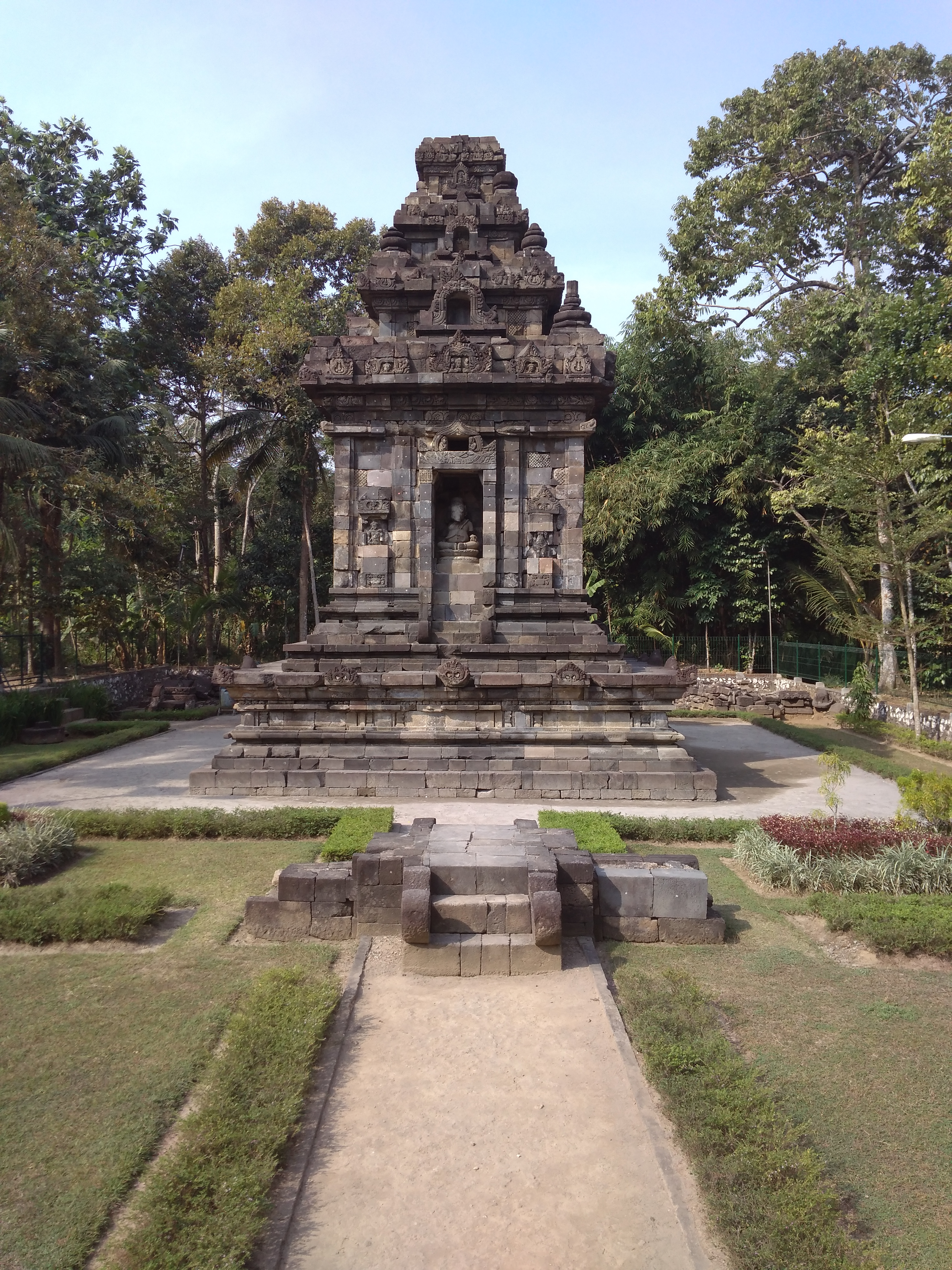
- Main temple of Candi Merak

- Location within Java Location within Indonesia

General information
- Architectural style: Central Javanese Candi
- Location: Klaten Regency, Central Java., Indonesia
- Coordinates: 7.669735°S 110.551275°E

Merak temple, or locally known as Candi Merak, is a 10th-century Javanese Shivaist Hindu temple complex located in Karangnongko village, in Klaten Regency, northwest from Klaten town, Central Java, on southeastern slopes of Mount Merapi. The temple complex consisted of a main building and three perwara (ancillary) temples, dating from the 9th or 10th century, from the Mataram kingdom.

Near Candi Merak there are several temple ruins and archaeological sites, however — unlike Candi Merak — most are in ruins and incomplete, such as Candi Karangnongko, Candi Kriyan and Candi Bekelan.

== History ==
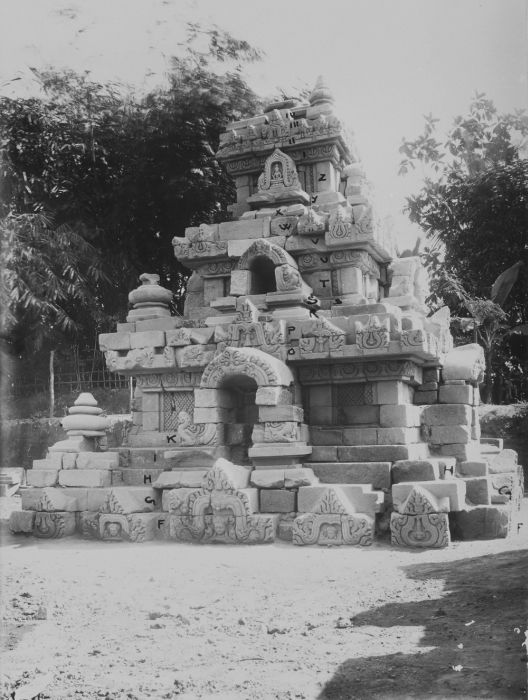
The reconstructed roof of Candi Merak

Regarding the architectural styles, deities, yoni housed in main chamber and carving of this temples, the temple is dedicated to Shiva and most probably constructed in 10th-century. The temple has been discovered in early 20th-century. A preliminary research has been conducted since 1925/1926 by archaeology authority of Dutch East Indies. The reconstruction project slowly conducted, and finished in 2011, although the top ratna pinnacle is still missing.

== Architecture ==
The temple occupy 1,480 square meter area. The main temple has been completely reconstructed, and the condition of bas-reliefs and statues are quite well-preserved. The main temple faces east and the ruins of three perwara temples located in front of the main temples. A flight of stairs located on east side, flanked by two of well-preserved makara. Unlike makaras in other temples, the Candi Merak's makaras are unique, its trunks is shaped as cobra-like Nāga, creating a makara-naga chimera. The stairs took visitors to its main portals adorned on top of it with Kala's head. Inside the main chamber there is a yoni with naga's head carved on northern side. It used to be a stone lingam erected upon this yoni, however it is now missing.

On the outer walls on each cardinal points there are three niches. The niche of west wall contains a statue of Ganesha, the northern niche store a statue of Durga Mahisasuramardini (Durga slaying the bull-demon), the southern niches is empty, but it is most likely that the niche used to contains a statue of Agastya. The statue of Ganesha although damaged are quite complete, the statue of Durga however is damaged, its head is missing, probably being looted. The roof are pyramidal, arranged in three receding terraces. Each of these terraces contains row of ratna pinnacles. The antefixes with deities' head projected upon in are surrounding the edges of the stepped roofs. The shapes of ratna and the style of antefixes with deities' head is similar to those of Gebang temple in northern Yogyakarta.

== See also ==
- Candi of Indonesia
