= Gunung Gangsir =

Hindu temple in Indonesia

Candi Gunung Gangsir
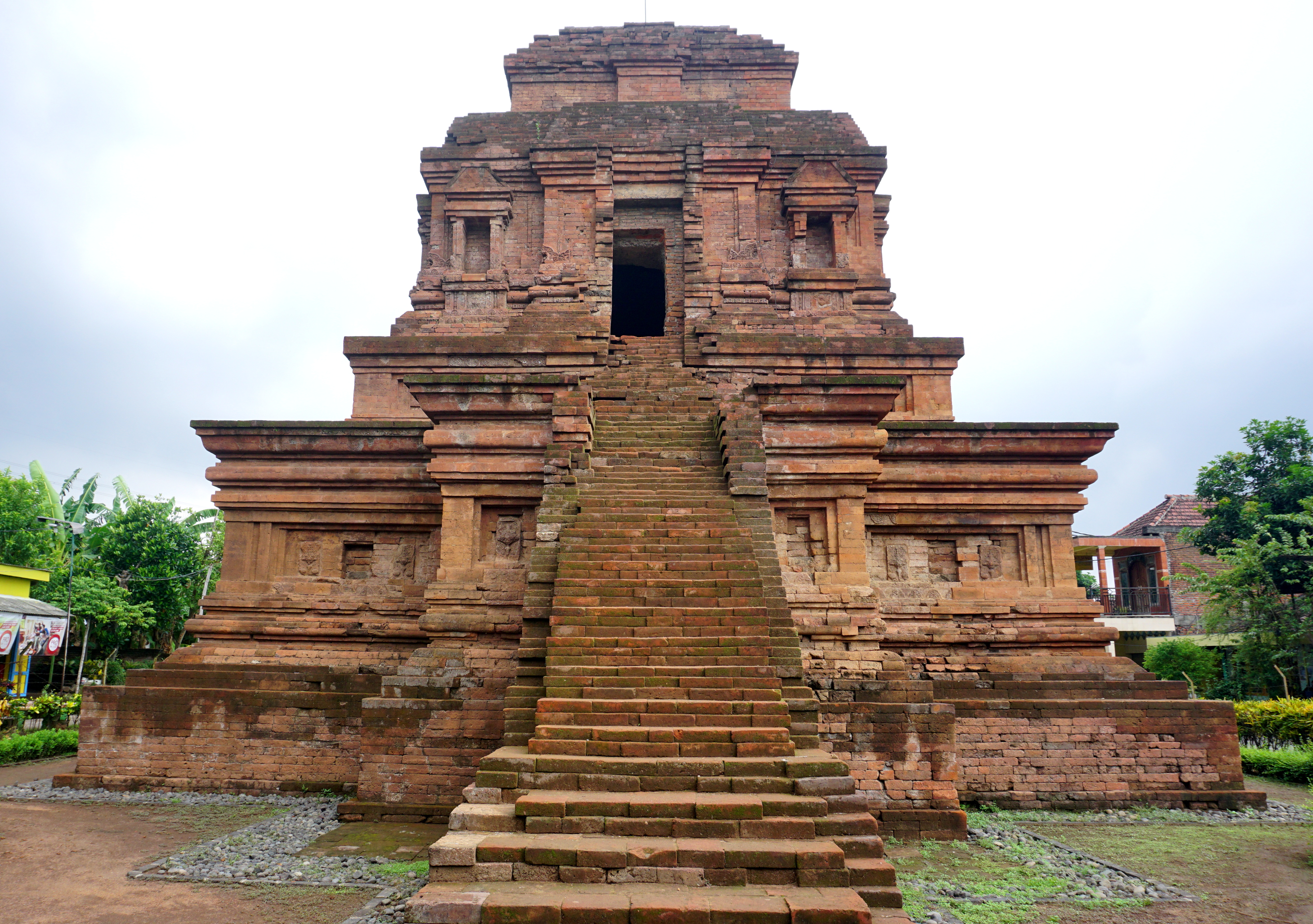
- Gunung Gangsir temple from front
- Interactive map of the Candi Gunung Gangsir area

General information
- Architectural style: Candi
- Location: Pasuruan, East Java., Indonesia
- Coordinates: 7°35′12″S 112°44′0″E

Technical details
- Size: 15 x 15 x 15 m

Gunung Gangsir (Indonesian: Candi Gunung Gangsir) is an 11th-century Hindu candi (temple) located approximately 5 kilometers west from the town of Bangil. This red brick structure is located in Gunung Gangsir village, Beji subdistrict, Pasuruan Regency, East Java Indonesia.

Gunung Gangsir is quite unique among East Javanese temples, because it was the only temple that combines East Javanese and Central Javanese candi styles. It is also the only known temple in East Java that uses clay casting techniques to display a variety of decorations.

This unique distinctions has led for the experts to suggests that the temple is actually far older than the nearby Pari and Jabung temples of Majapahit period, thus dated the temple circa 11th century CE, approximately during the reign of King Airlangga of Kahuripan Kingdom. Regarding the structure of this temple, Marijke J. Klokke, a Dutch archaeologist, suggests that Gunung Gangsir Temple possibly had been restored during the end of East Javanese kingdom period by using material from an older temple.

== Etymology ==
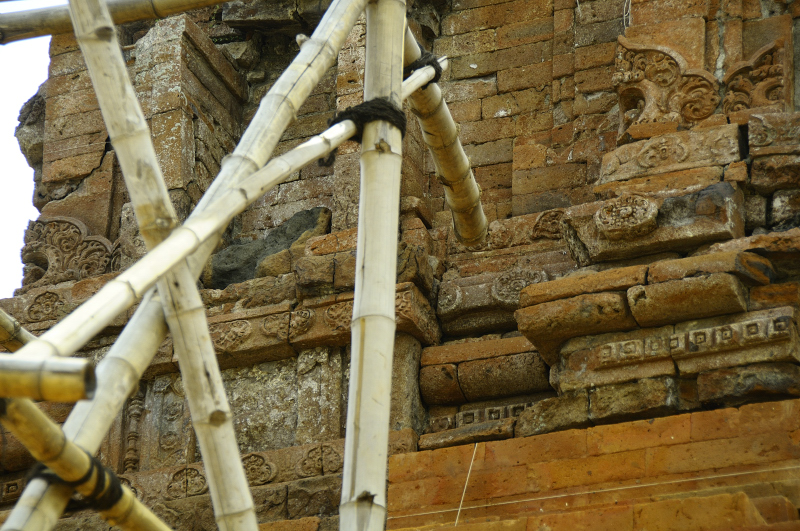
Remnants of the original bricks, showing details of brick work ornamentations.

The history of this temple – such as its original name, which deity being venerated in this temple, who was the king or regional ruler that commissioned the construction and when was it – are still unknown, since no records nor inscriptions found near the temple that could shed the information about this temple. Formerly, this temple was known by locals as Keboncandi temple.

There are myths circulating among surrounding populations about this temple. The term gunung means "mountain" in local language – possibly refer to the shape of temple ruins prior to reconstruction – an earthen brick mound that resembles a mountain. While the word gangsir (Javanese: nggangsir) means "to dig a hole" under the surface of the ground, or "digging a tunnel". According to local residents, this name appears when one day there was someone who tried to dig a hole into the mound to loot valuable objects under the temple building. Subsequently, the temple was known by the name of Candi Gunung Gangsir.

== Structure and design ==
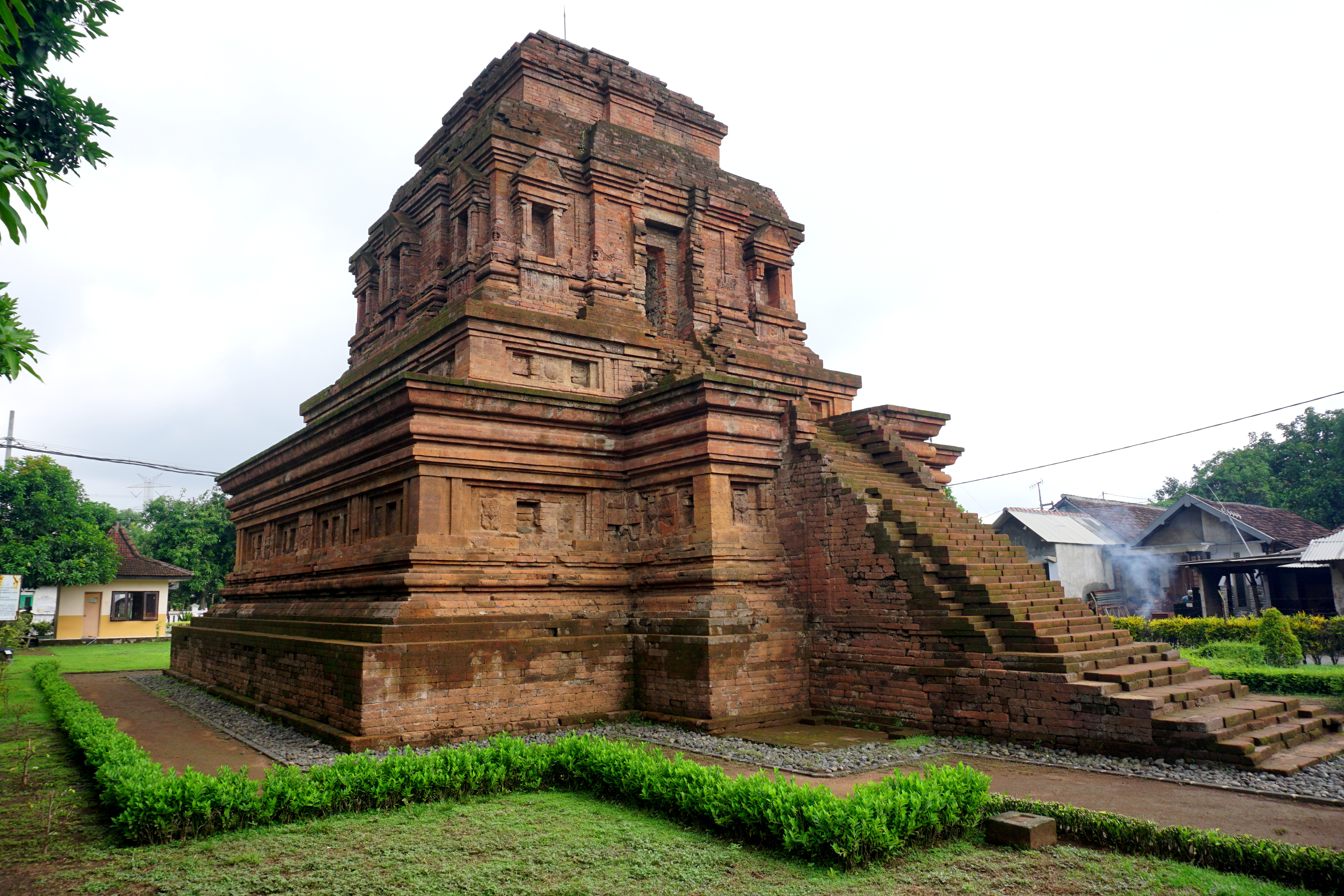
Gunung Gangsir temple viewed from the south.

The temple structure was made from red bricks, which is a common temple building materials in the region during Majapahit period (c. 14th to 15th century), as demonstrated by Pari and Jabung temple nearby. However, the design, shape and proportion, also the decorations is more similar to Central Javanese temples from earlier period. The proportion for example, is quite similar to the 8th century Mendut temple near Borobudur. Thus, experts put the construction period circa 11th century CE.

The temple is facing East-Southeast direction, with a flight of stairs and portal facing that direction protruding on the east side of temple structure. The temple base is rectangular in shape with dimension of 15 metres x 15 metres. The temple is 15 metres in height, with visible distinction between foot (base) part, body, and roof. The elevated terrace and the room is about 5 metres in high from the ground, accessible through the stairs. Inside the temple, there is a spacious cella served as garbagriha or inner sanctum. The roof is arranged in stepped pyramid arranged in three stages, the top stage and its pinnacle however is now missing.

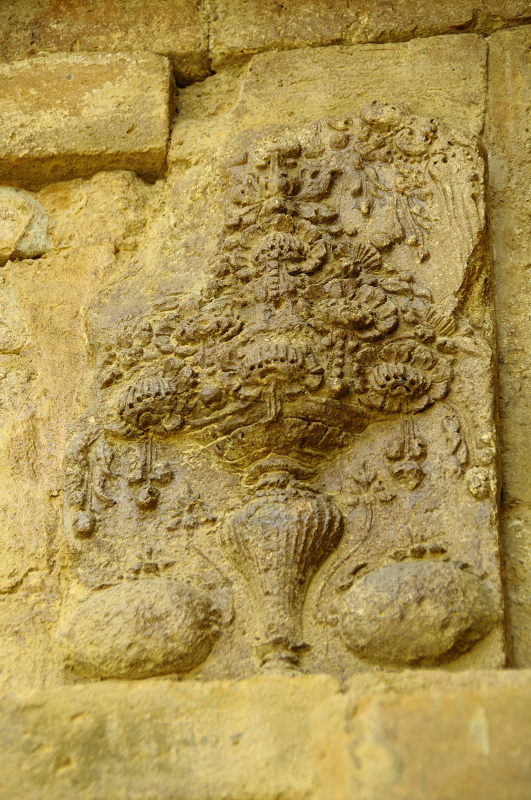
Temple decorations of vessels with floral motif, made by clay mold casting technique.

The temple is quite richly adorned with niches, seams and decorated antefixes. Intricate panels, featuring ornaments in the form of bas-reliefs, vessels with floral motifs, pilasters, images of trees and animals, which are made with clay molding techniques. There are traces of plasters known as vajralepa, which suggest originally the entire surface of the temple was covered with plaster, which is similar to the Kalasan and Sari temple near Prambanan.

== See also ==
- Pari Temple
- Jawi Temple
- Jabung
- Trowulan
- Gunung Wukir
