= Bahal, Indonesia =

Coordinates: 1°25′N 99°43′E

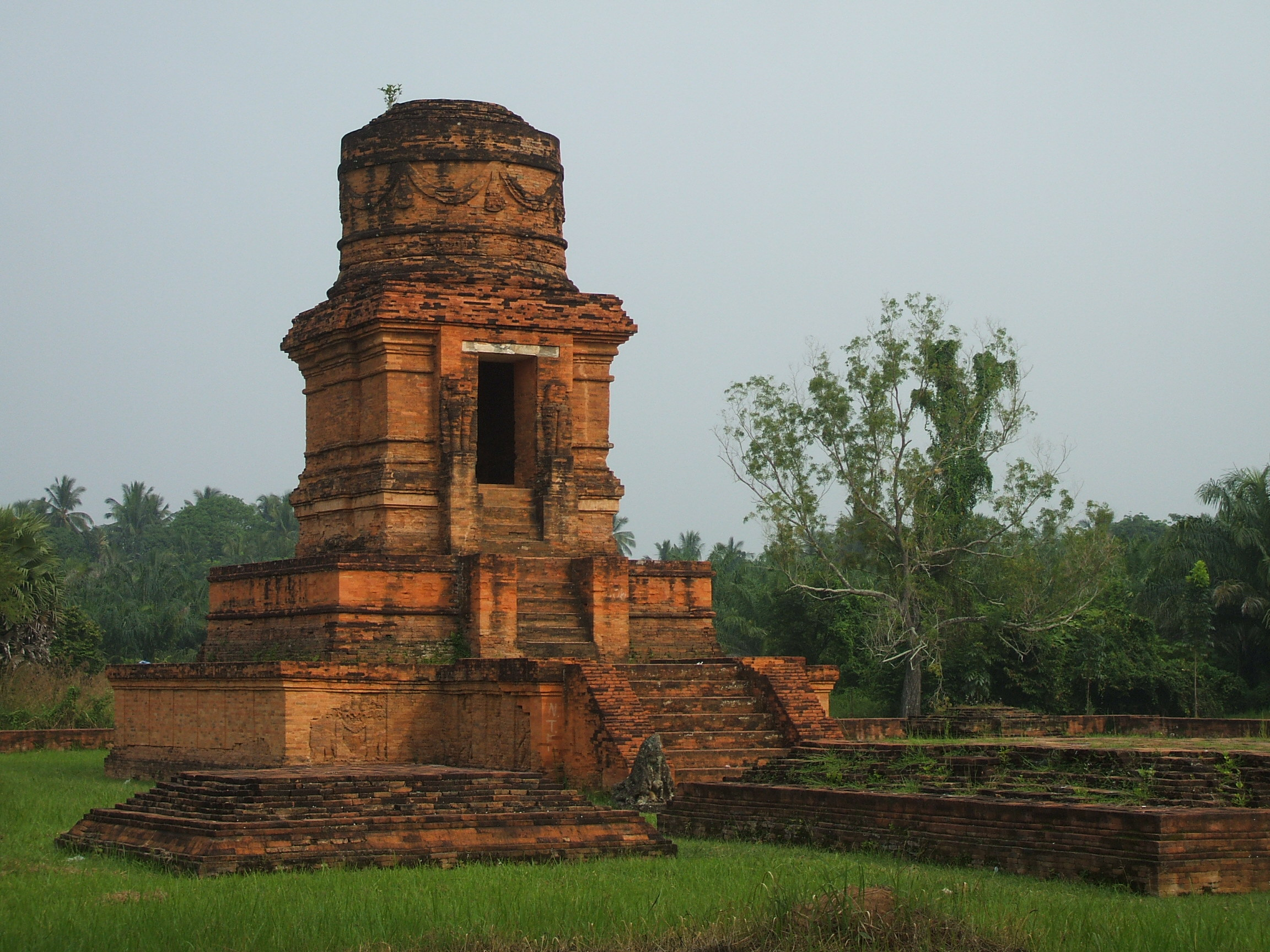
Bahal I temple at Bahal

Bahal is a village in Portibi subdistrict, North Padang Lawas Regency, North Sumatra province, Indonesia. The Vajrayana Buddhist Bahal temple is located in this village.
