= Sumberawan =

Buddhist stupa near Malang, East Java, Indonesia

Candi Sumberawan
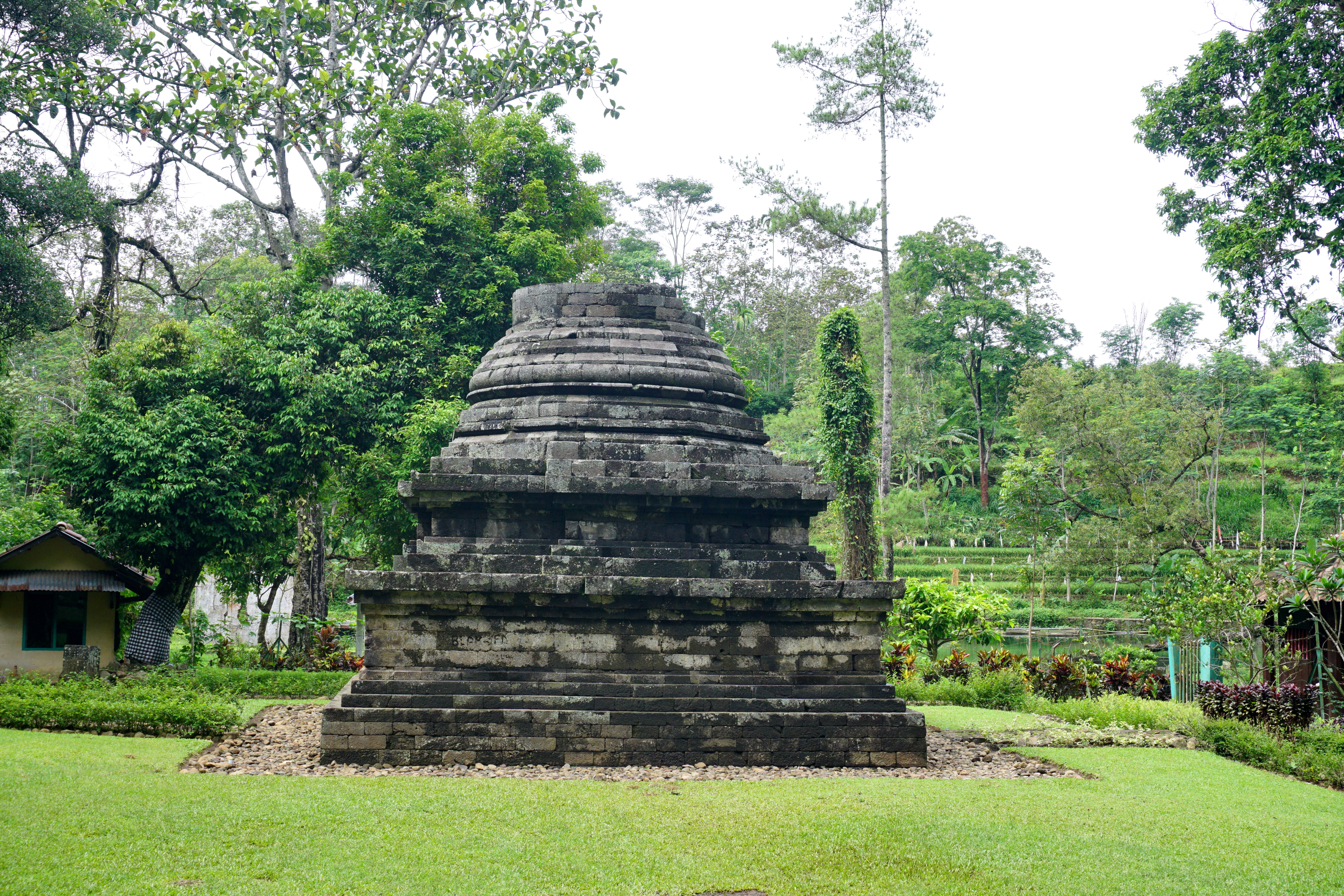
- Sumberawan stupa viewed from east
- Interactive map of the Candi Sumberawan area

General information
- Architectural style: Candi stupa
- Location: Malang, East Java., Indonesia
- Coordinates: 7°51′25″S 112°39′7.2″E

Technical details
- Size: 6.25 m x 6.25 m x 5.23 m

Sumberawan is a Buddhist stupa located in Toyomarto village, Sumberawan subdistrict, Malang Regency, East Java, Indonesia. The stupa is located in the highlands, on the southern slope of Mount Arjuno, surrounded by numerous Springs.

It is located about 6 kilometres north of Singhasari temple. The stupa is traditionally linked to the historic Singhasari Kingdom that ruled the area circa 13th Century CE, however experts suggest that it dates from about the end of 14th century to the beginning of 15th century, during Majapahit period.

== Structure ==
Sumberawan is quite unique, since it was the only Buddhist shrine in East Java that was built in the shape of stupa structure. In contrast to Buddhist temples in the region that built in typical candi architecture; such as nearby Singhasari, Jago, Brahu in Trowulan and Jabung temple in Paiton.

The stupa consists of square base and cylindrical body of bell-shaped stupa, akin to Central Javanese Borobudur-style stupa, while the pinnacle is missing. The structure is made of andesite stone. The structure consists of a square base, pedestal, and a stupa. Rectangular base measures each sides 6.30 metres and 2.60 metres in height. Above the base is the rectangular pedestal measuring side of 5.04 m and height of 1.08 meters. The stupa consists of a rectangular-shaped pedestal measuring 4.24 x 4.24 m, the lower part of the stupa with an octagonal shape, topped with a rounded lotus-shaped cushion and a bell-shaped stupa body. The height of the stupa is 2.42 m. Total measurement of the stupa is 6.25 metres in length, width of 6.25 metres, and height of 5.23 metres.

== Location ==
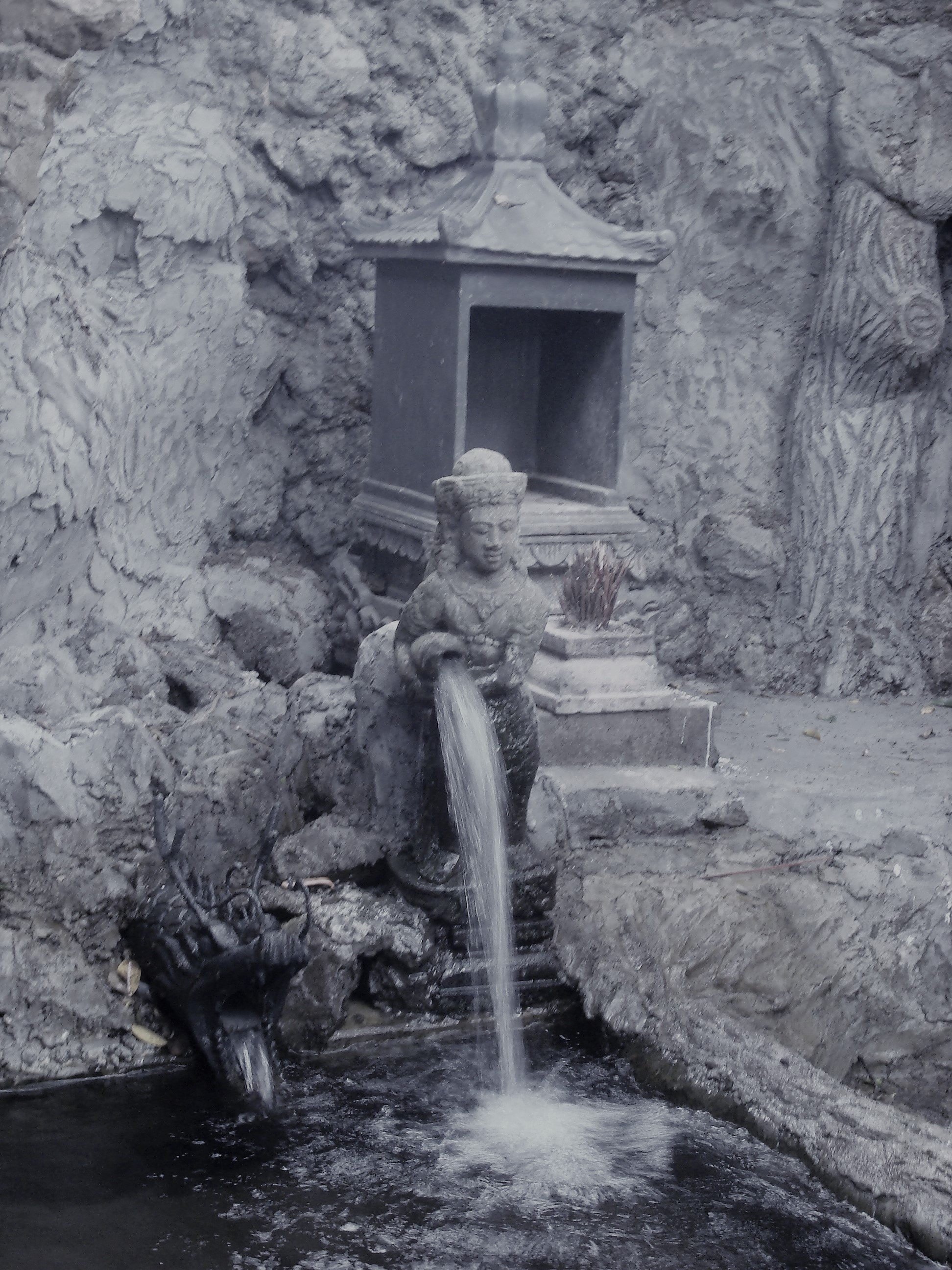
Water spring at Sumberawan

Built at an altitude of 650 m above sea level, at the foot of Mount Arjuno, the scenery around this temple is quite beautiful. The temple is located near a water spring with a very clear water, thus gave the name of the temple; Sumber-awan, in Javanese sumber means "water spring", while awan means "noon". It is thought the clear spring in the past is considered as a holy spring, essential for Hindu-Buddhist rituals. Thus the shrine was built as the landmarker, the guardian and the protector of the water spring.

== History ==
This site has been identified with Kasurangganan, or 'the garden of the heavenly nymphs', which was mentioned in the Nagarakretagama manuscript as having been visited by King Hayam Wuruk of Majapahit during his royal tour across his realm in East Java in 1359.

The numbers written on the stones of dagoba (small stupa) indicate the period between the 11th and 15th centuries. However, examining the architecture and style, this simple form of stupa is thought to originate from between late 14th to early 15th century.

In modern times, Sumberawan temple was first discovered during the Dutch East Indies period in 1904. In 1935 a visit was made by researchers from the Archaeological Service. In 1937 a restoration was carried out on the base and pedestal parts of the structure, while the rest of stupa was reconstructed modestly, since most of the stones of stupa and chattra pinnacle are missing.

== See also ==
- Candi of Indonesia
- Buddhism in Indonesia
- Prajnaparamita of Java
