= Gunung Wukir =

Hindu temple in Indonesia

Candi Gunung Wukir
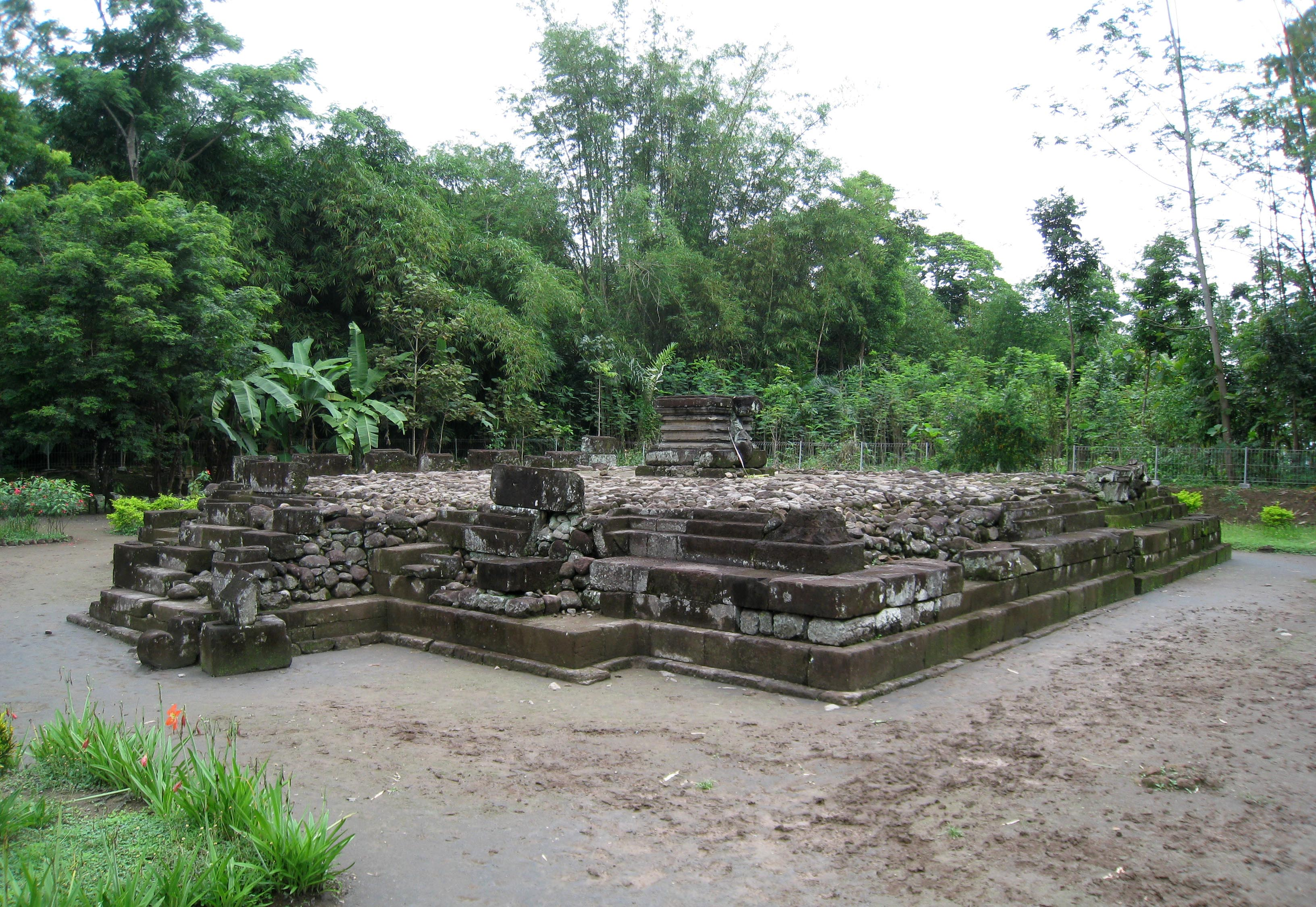
- The ruin of the main temple of Canggal, only the base and a Yoni remain, the body and roof parts are missing.

- Location within Java Location within Indonesia

General information
- Architectural style: Central Javanese Candi
- Location: Magelang Regency, Central Java., Indonesia
- Coordinates: 7.634266°S 110.296801°E

Gunung Wukir temple, or Canggal temple, or also known as Shivalinga is a Shivaite Hindu temple dated from the early 8th century, located in Canggal hamlet, Kadiluwih village, Salam subdistrict, Magelang Regency, Central Java, Indonesia. The temple dates to the year 732, making it the first structure attributed to the ancient Mataram kingdom, which ruled Central Java from 732 to around the middle of the tenth century.

== Location ==
Because of its relatively remote location, the temple site rarely appears on the itineraries of foreign tourists. But it possesses some historical importance owed to its links with the formation of the Central Javanese Mataram kingdom. The temple is located on Wukir hill, which the locals refer to as Gunung Wukir ("Mount Wukir", or "carved hill" in Javanese), on the western slopes of Mount Merapi volcano. The hill is located approximately 4 kilometres southeast from the town of Muntilan. Gunung Wukir temple can be reached by following the direction to the Ngluwar subdistrict by turning west from the Semen intersection, on Yogyakarta-Magelang main road. The Kadiluwih hamlet in Canggal, is connected to the Ngluwar road by a small walking trail that leads up to the hill plateau, approximately 300 meters above sea level.

== History ==
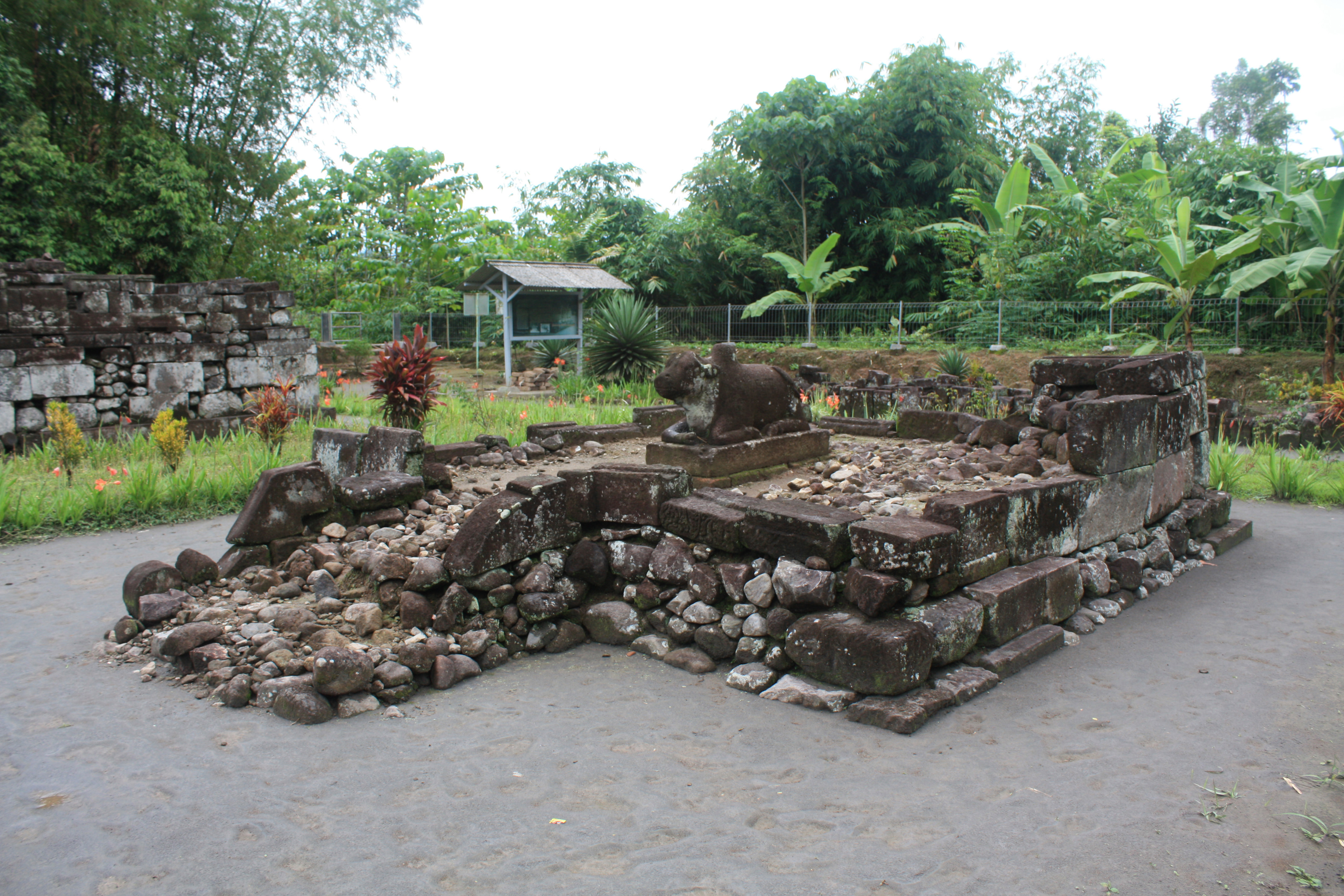
The statue of Nandi bull, the vehicle of Shiva inside central perwara temple

This temple is the oldest surviving temple in Southern Central Java, connected to the Canggal inscription discovered within the temple ruins in 1879. The inscription describes the erection of a lingam (the symbol of Shiva) on the country of Kunjarakunja, by Sanjaya's order. The lingam is sited on the noble island of Yava (Java), which the inscription describes as "rich in grain and gold mines". According to the inscription, the temple was founded during the reign of King Sanjaya from the Mataram kingdom, in 654 Saka (732 CE). This inscription contains a lot of information related to Mataram kingdom or Ancient Mataram. Based on this inscription, Gunung Wukir temple might originally have been called Shivalinga or Kunjarakunja.

== Architecture ==
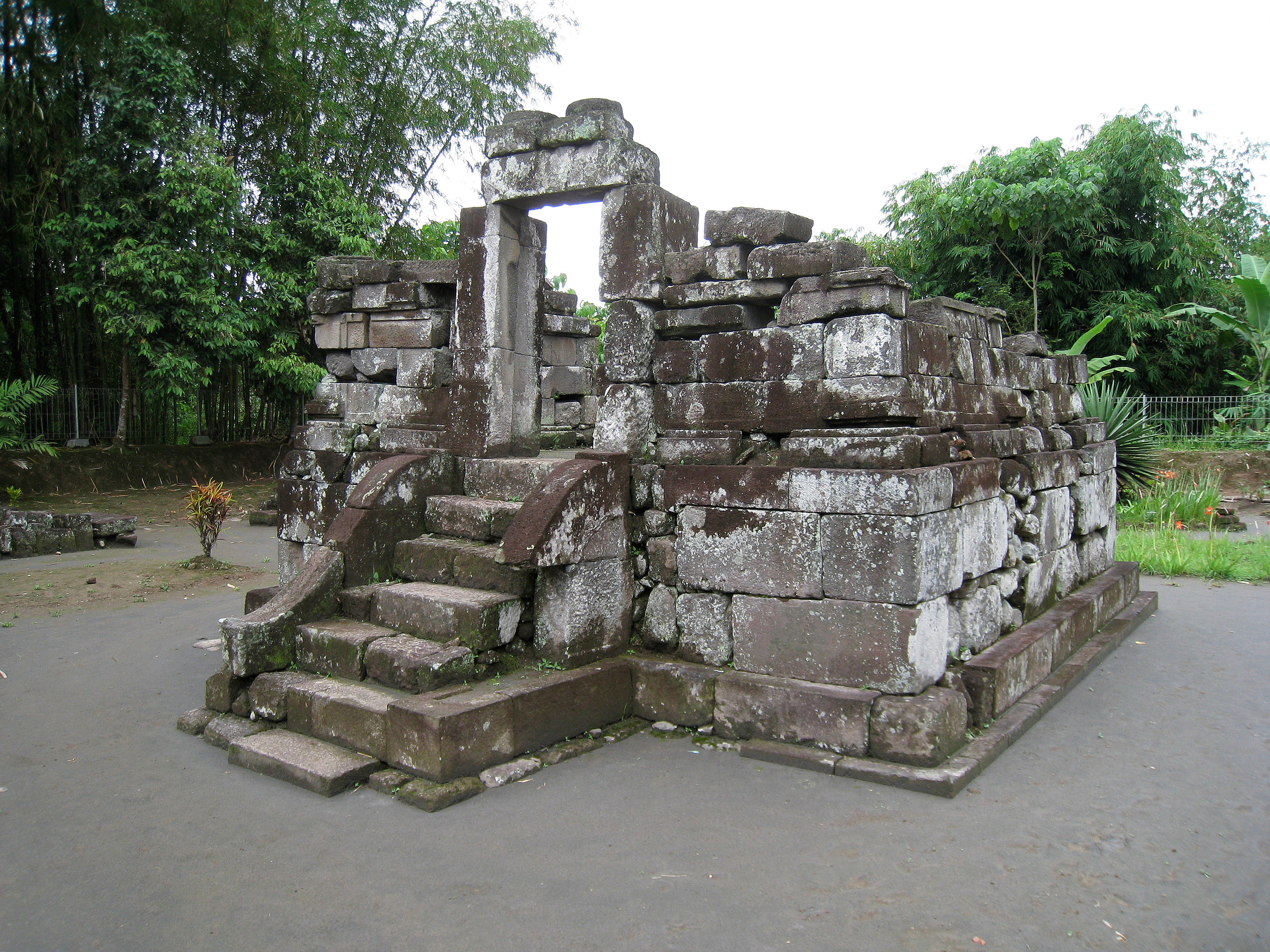
One of the three perwara (complementary) temples in front of main temple of Gunung Wukir

The temple compound measures 50 metres x 50 metres. The temple building is made of andesite stone, and at least consist of a main temple and three perwara temples (guardian or complementary smaller temple) lined in front of the main temple. In addition to the inscription, within the temple complex were also found archaeological artifacts including yoni pedestal and the statue of the sacred cow Nandi the vehicle of Shiva. According to the inscription, the yoni once support a lingam, the symbol of the god Shiva, however it is now missing.

== See also ==
- Candi of Indonesia
