= Pari Temple =

Hindu temple in East Java, Indonesia

Candi Pari
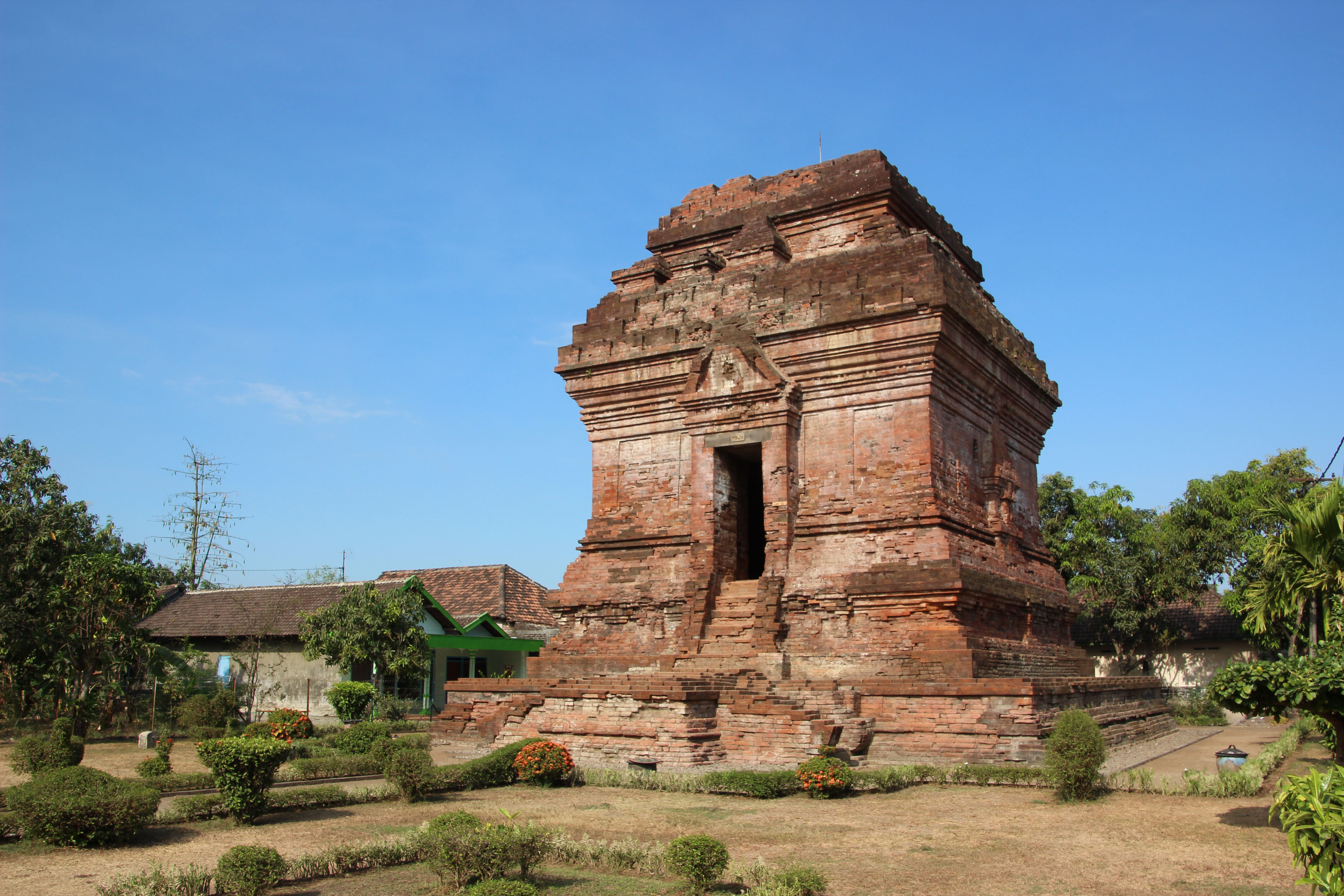
- Pari temple building
- Interactive map of the Candi Pari area

General information
- Architectural style: Candi
- Location: Sidoarjo, East Java., Indonesia
- Coordinates: 7°30′57″S 112°41′00″E

Technical details
- Size: 13.55 x 13.40 x 13.80 m

Pari temple (Indonesian: Candi Pari) is a 14th-century Hindu candi (temple) located approximately 2 kilometers northwest from Sidoarjo mud flow. This red brick structure is located in Candi Pari village, Porong subdistrict, Sidoarjo Regency, East Java Indonesia.

On top of the gate, there is a carved stone inscription with date 1293 Saka or corresponds to 1371 CE, dated from Majapahit period during the reign Hayam Wuruk (r. 1350-1389).

== See also ==
- Trowulan
- Jawi Temple
- Jabung
- Gunung Gangsir
