= Jabung =

14th-century Buddhist site in Indonesia

Coordinates: 7°44′6″S 113°28′18″E

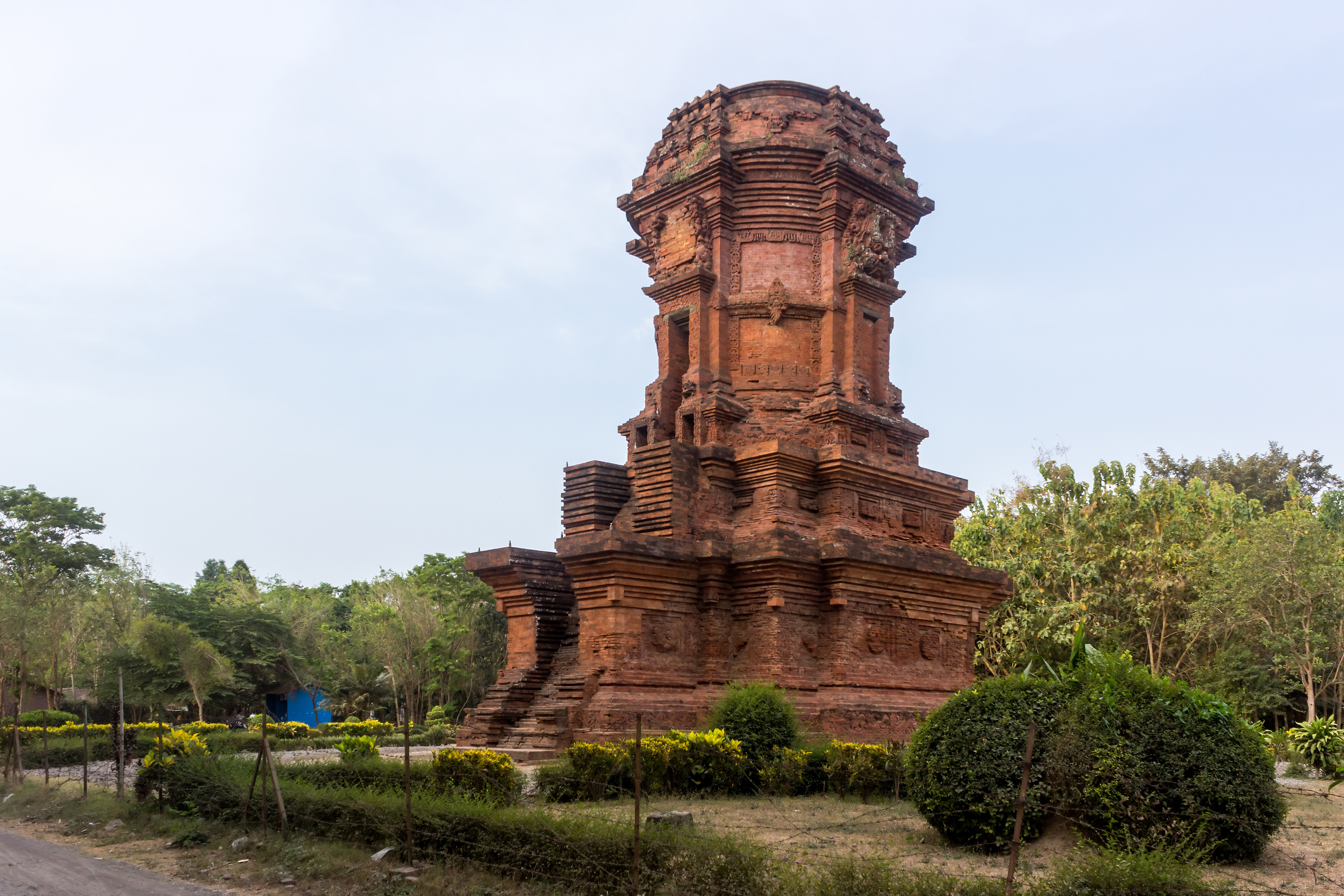
Jabung Temple, 2017

Jabung is a 14th-century Buddhist temple dated from Majapahit era, located in the Jabung Sisir village (desa), Paiton area, Probolinggo district, East Java, Indonesia. The temple is made from red brick measuring 16.20 metres. The temple was mentioned in Nagarakretagama as Bajrajinaparamitapura (Vajra Jina Paramita Pura), being visited by king Hayam Wuruk during his royal tour across East Java in 1359 CE. The temple is mentioned in Pararaton as Sajabung, a mortuary temple of Bhre Gundal, a member of Majapahit royalties.

The architecture style of this temple is similar to the Bahal temple in Padang Lawas, North Sumatra.

== Architecture ==
The temple complex measures 35 x 40 metres. The temple underwent restoration between 1983 and 1987, and the temple complex was expanded by 20.042 square metres with an altitude of 8 metres from sea level. The temple complex consists of two structures; one main temple and a smaller structure called "Candi Sudut" (corner temple) located in the southwest corner from the main structure. The temple building was constructed from high quality red brick material, some parts of which are decorated with bas relief.

The main temple measures 13.13 metres and 9.60 metres with a height of 16.20 metres. Jabung temple faces west, with the western part having a projected structure which forms a flight of stairs reaching up to the main chamber on the elevated upper platform. The corner temple, on the southwest part of the main structure, measures 2.55 metres wide and is 6 metres tall. This structure is not really a temple but is the only surviving corner tower of the red brick walls once surrounded the inner compound of the temple.

The temple has four parts: batur (base platform), foot, body, and roof. The body structure is almost cylindrical octagonal, stood upon three stepped rectangular platforms. The roof took shape of cylindrical dagoba decorated with sulur floral motif, however the roof's upper parts was destroyed or missing beyond reconstruction. In the garbagriha (main chamber) there is a pedestal, a buddhist statue may once stood here. On the upper part of entrance arch inscribed with 1276 saka, corresponds to 1354 CE during the reign of King Hayam Wuruk.

== Description ==
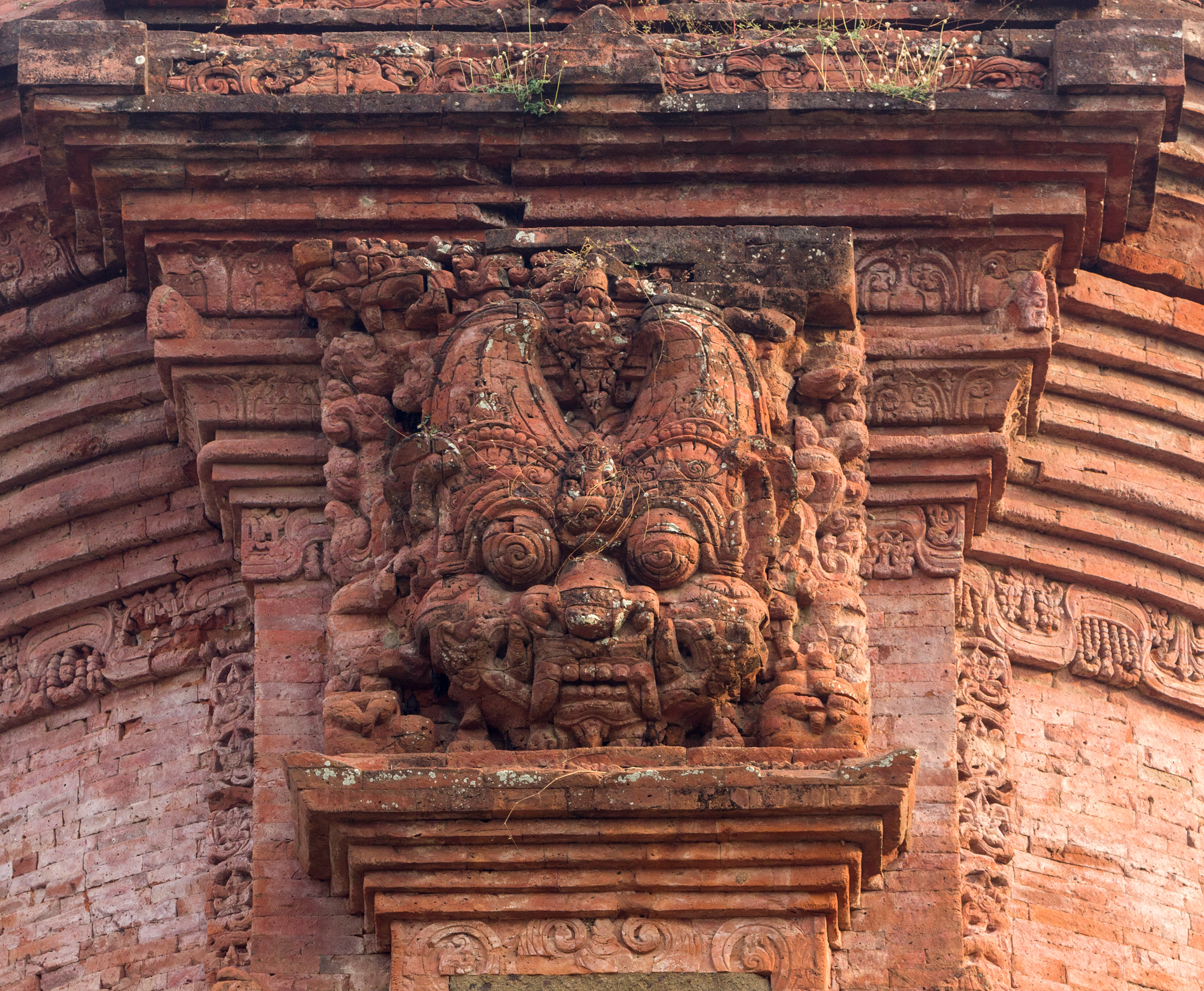
The detail of kala's head on upper part of the niche

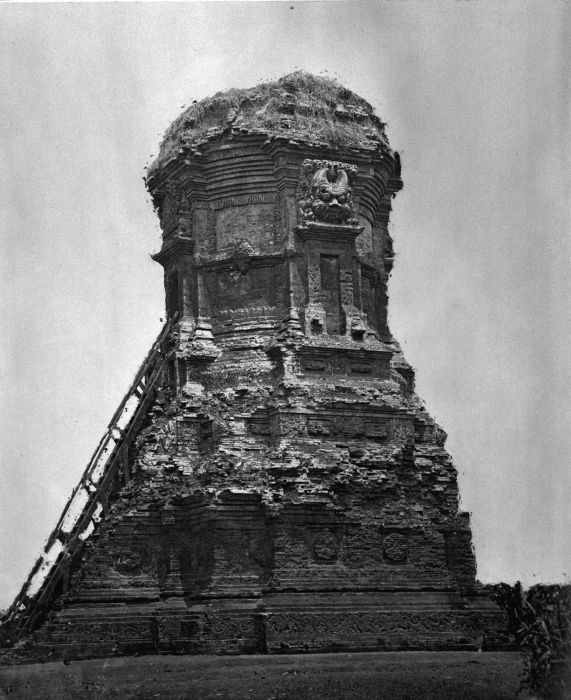
Jabung temple in 1866

=== Lower platform ===
Batur or lower platform measuring 13.11 metres long, 9.58 metres wide. On this platform there is narrow path surrounding the temple decorated with several panels of bas relief describing everyday life, such as:

- A hermit wearing turban with his disciple.
- Two man near a well, one man holding the bucket's rope.
- Between these panels there are several projected rounded panels shaped like a medallion, however the reliefs is already broken
- Two lions facing each other.

=== Foot ===
Rectangular structure with west part projected as flight of stairs. There are two smaller empty niches measuring 1.30 metres. The foot part consists of two stepped rectangular platforms.

1. Lower foot Started with frame upon lower platform took a bell like shape decorated with padina leaf motifs. The structure is 0.6 metres tall, decorated with medallion-shaped panels of bas reliefs depicting human, animals and plants.
2. Upper foot Sat upon the lower foot, the shape of this structure is similar slightly smaller than the later. Decorated with padma (lotus) motifs. Some of vertical parts measuring 0.5 metres are decorated with kala's head and leaf ornaments.

=== Body ===
On the wall of the temple's body carved with the images of humans, houses and plants. On Southeast corner there is an image of a woman riding a giant fish. In Hinduism the scene is taken from the tale of Sri Tanjung, telling the story about loyalty and fidelity of a wife. The bas relief of Sri Tanjung is also founds in Penataran Temple in Blitar, Surawana in Kediri, and the gate of Bajangratu in Trowulan. Through the door there is a main chamber (garbagriha) measuring 2.60 x 2.58 metres and 5.52 metres tall. On top of the interior there is a carves stone. The body of the temple took octagonal almost cylindrical shape decorated with band-like projected carving surrounding the body. There is one door and three niches located on cardinal points. On upper part of the door and niches is decorated with kala's heads, on the lower part is carved with naga heads. On the upper door frame there is an andesite stone block carved with 1276 saka or 1354 CE, dating the completion of temple construction.

=== Roof ===
Most of the roof upper parts is missing. Judging from the existing parts, experts suggested that the roof was crowned with stupa decorated with floral patterns.

== Location ==
The temple is around 5 kilometres to the east of the town of Kraksaan, or 500 metres southeast from the Jabung Tirta swimming pool, on the main Surabaya - Situbondo highway. The turnoff to the temple, which leads onto a small side road on the south side of the highway, is not signposted. The turn is in the village (desa) of Jabung Sisir, just before desa Randu Merak.

== See also ==
- Borobudur
- Candi Mendut
- Candi Pawon
- Trowulan
- Jawi Temple
- Pari Temple
- Gunung Gangsir
