= Bahal temple =

Buddhist site in Indonesia

Bahal temples
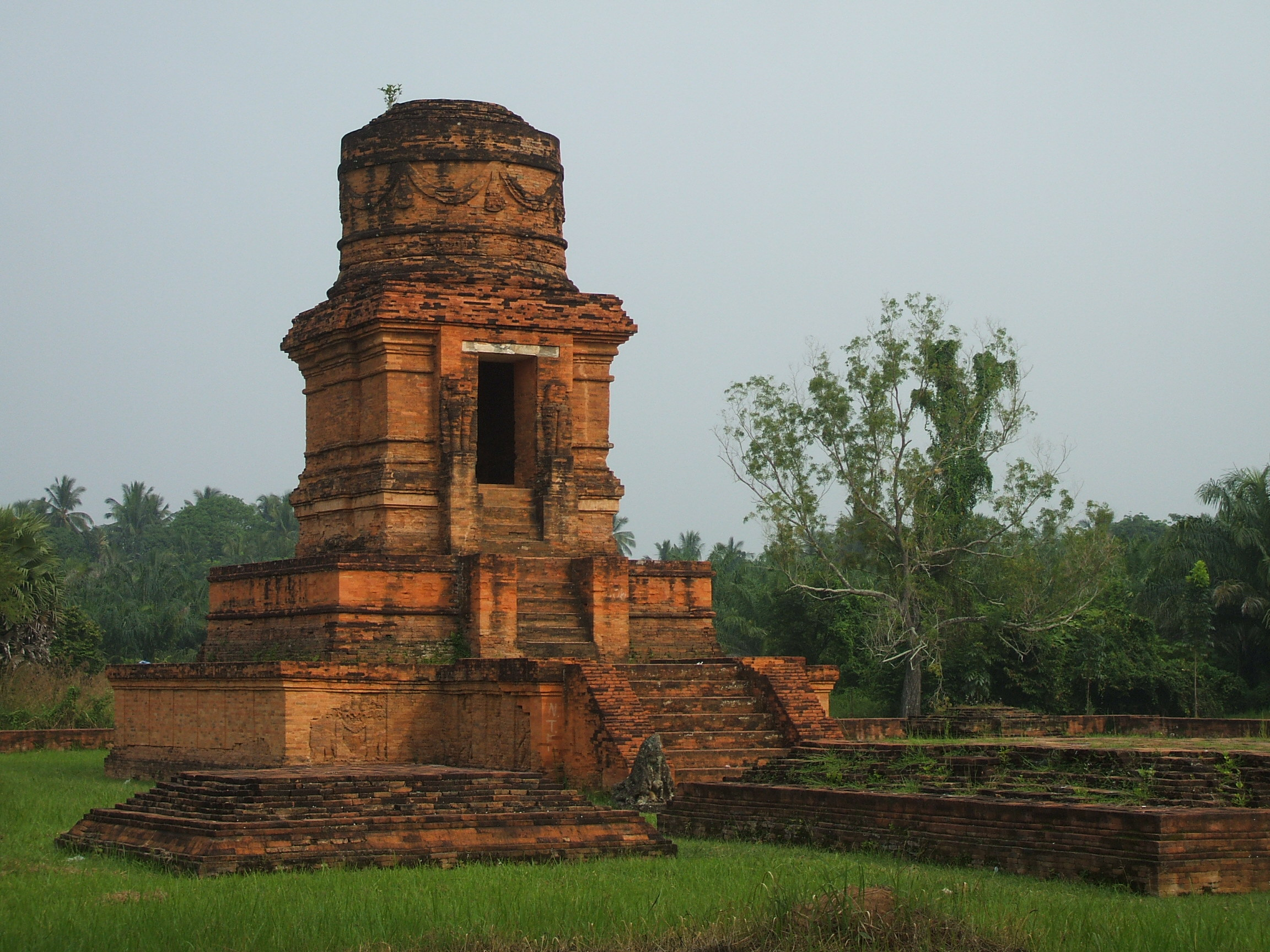
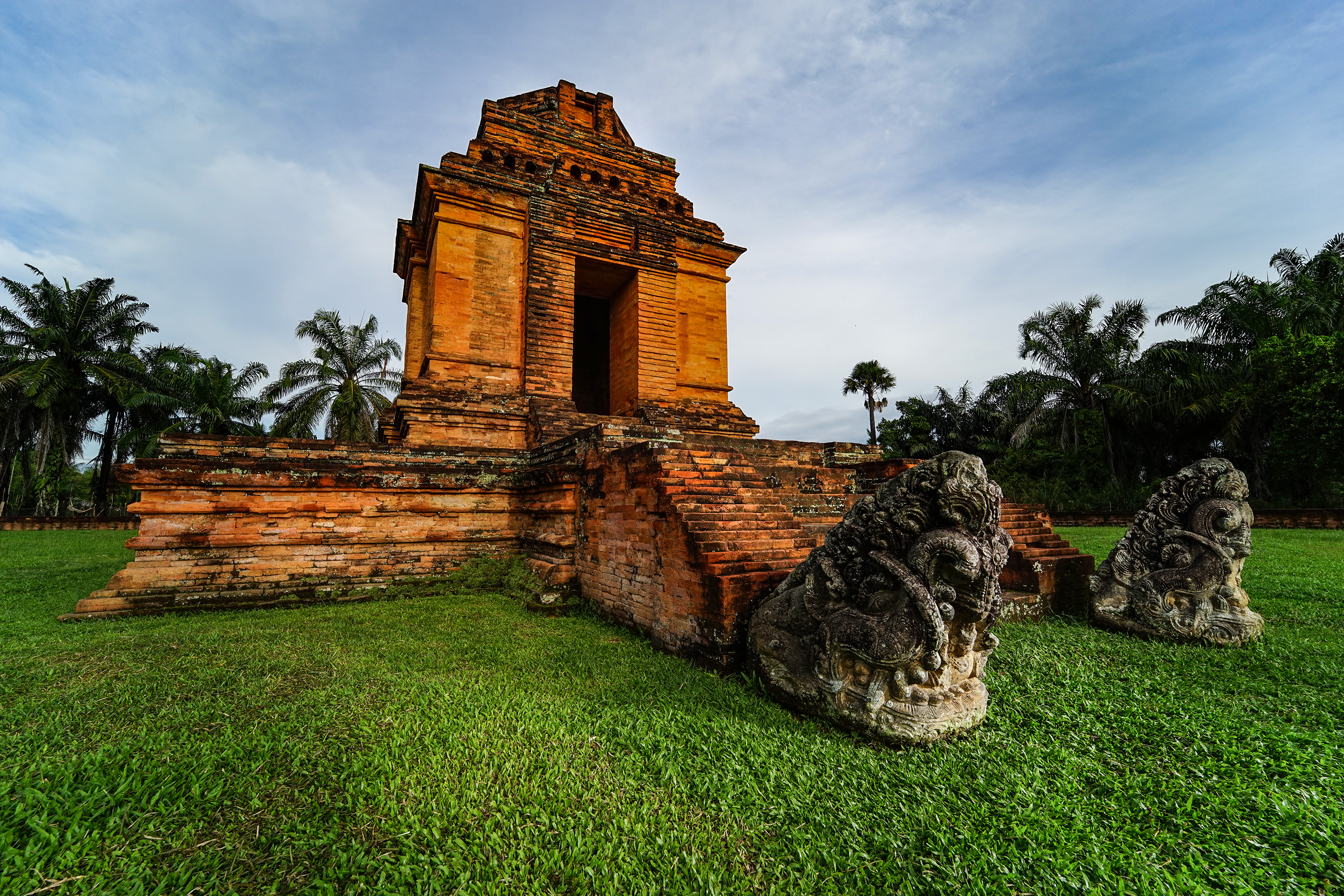
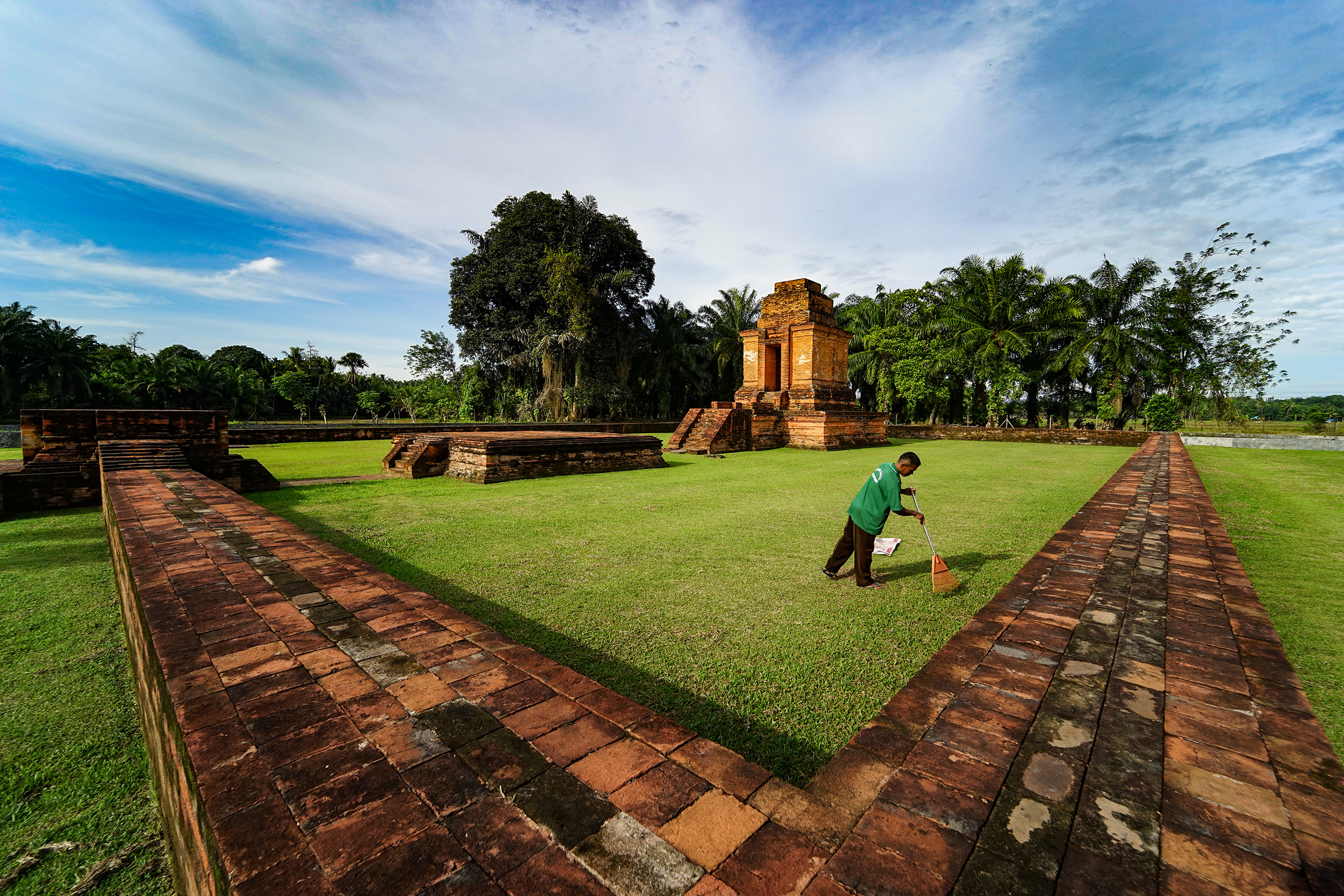
- Bahal temples of Bahal I, Bahal II, and Bahal III, in Bahal village.
- Interactive map of Bahal temples
- 1°24′20″N 99°43′50″E
- Periods: Hindu-Buddhist (11th to 13th century)
- Location: Bahal, Indonesia

Candi Bahal, also known as Biaro Bahal (biaro, derived from vihara, a monastery) or Candi Portibi (Batak portibi, derived from prithivi, "earth") is Vajrayana Buddhist candi complex in Bahal village, Padang Bolak, Portibi, Padang Lawas Regency, North Sumatra, Indonesia. It is located about three hours journey with car from Padangsidempuan or 400 km from Medan. The complex includes three candis: Candi Bahal I, Candi Bahal II, and Candi Bahal III. The temple site is linked to Pannai Kingdom circa 11th to 13th century CE.

== History ==
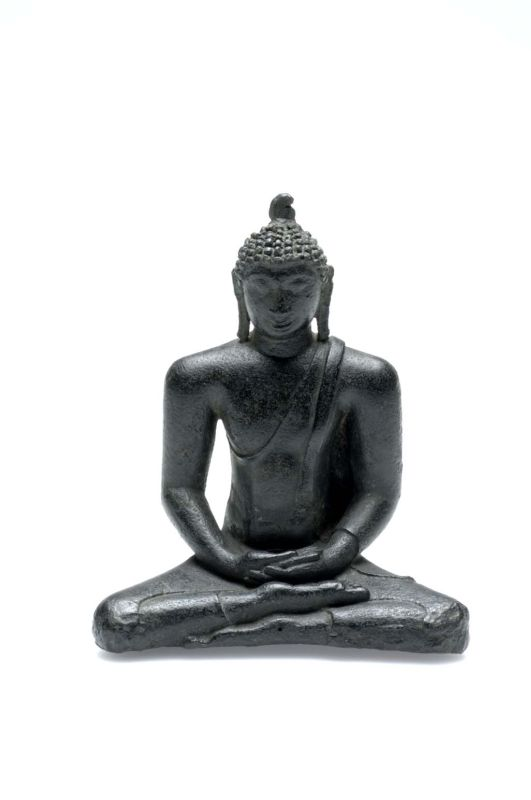
Buddha Amitabha bronze statue found at Si Pamatung in Barumun Tengah district

Candi Bahal are one of a group of temples discovered in Padang Lawas. Padang Lawas (Minangkabau "broad plain") is a grassy flat plain located between the Barisan Mountains and the highlands of northern Sumatra. The plain is kept free of tall vegetation by the prevailing dry winds sweeping through the gap between the two highlands. There were no major settlements in Padang Lawas, but the area provided a strategic route for people moving between the east and west coast of Sumatra. The flow of people in the area might provide the reason for the establishment of 11th and 13th century shrines found in the area. At least 25 brick shrines have been discovered in the plain of Padang Lawas, including Candi Pulo, Candi Barumun, Candi Singkilon, Candi Sipamutung, Candi Aloban, Candi Rondaman Dolok, Candi Bara, Candi Magaledang, Candi Sitopayan and Candi Nagasaribu. No kingdoms were associated with these temples, at least according to inscriptions discovered in the site, however the religion is identical to that practiced by Adityawarman. Candi Bahal are the only temples that has been fully restored, the other were still in ruins.

Construction of the temples of Padang Lawas were estimated to be between the 11th to 13th century CE. They were possibly linked with Pannai Kingdom, one of the trading ports on the coast of Strait of Malacca under Srivijayan mandala.

Restoration of Candi Bahal I occurred in 1977-1978 and 1982–1983. Candi Bahal II has been restored between 1991 and 1992.

== Temple Complex ==
The three temples of Bahal are separated by a distance of about 500 meter. The complex of the temple is known locally as biaro (from vihara or monastery), possibly indicating a clue to its original use. The names of three of the Bahal temples indicate connections with Nepal and Sri Lanka. Bahal is a term still used in Nepal to refer the two-storied temples of the Vajrayana, a major sect which influenced Buddhism in Indonesia. Rampant lions carved flanking the temple of Biaro Bahal I was similar to carvings at Polonaruva, the 11th-century capital of Sri Lanka. The complex is the largest in North Sumatra. All three temples of Bahal were constructed of red bricks, while the sculptures were constructed of sand stones. Each temple are surrounded with a perimeter red brick wall about 1 meter thick and 1 meter tall. A gate on the eastern wall provide entrance gateway into the temple; the gate is extended outward with 60 cm tall walls in both sides. The main temple of each complexes is located in the center.

The architecture of this temple is similar to Jabung temple located in Probolinggo, East Java.

Despite its rich archaeological value, unlike the popular temples of Java, the Padang Lawas temples are mostly neglected and in the state of ruins, partly due to its isolated location. There are some attempts to promote the temples as a tourism attraction; however, because of its remote location and poor infrastructure, promotion and tourism activity is limited.

== See also ==
- Jabung, a Majapahit Buddhist temple with architecture style similar to Bahal temple
- Muara Takus, a Buddhist stupa in Riau
- Muaro Jambi Temple Compounds, a temple complex in Jambi
