= Gebang =

Hindu temple in Indonesia

Coordinates: 7.751454°S 110.416117°E

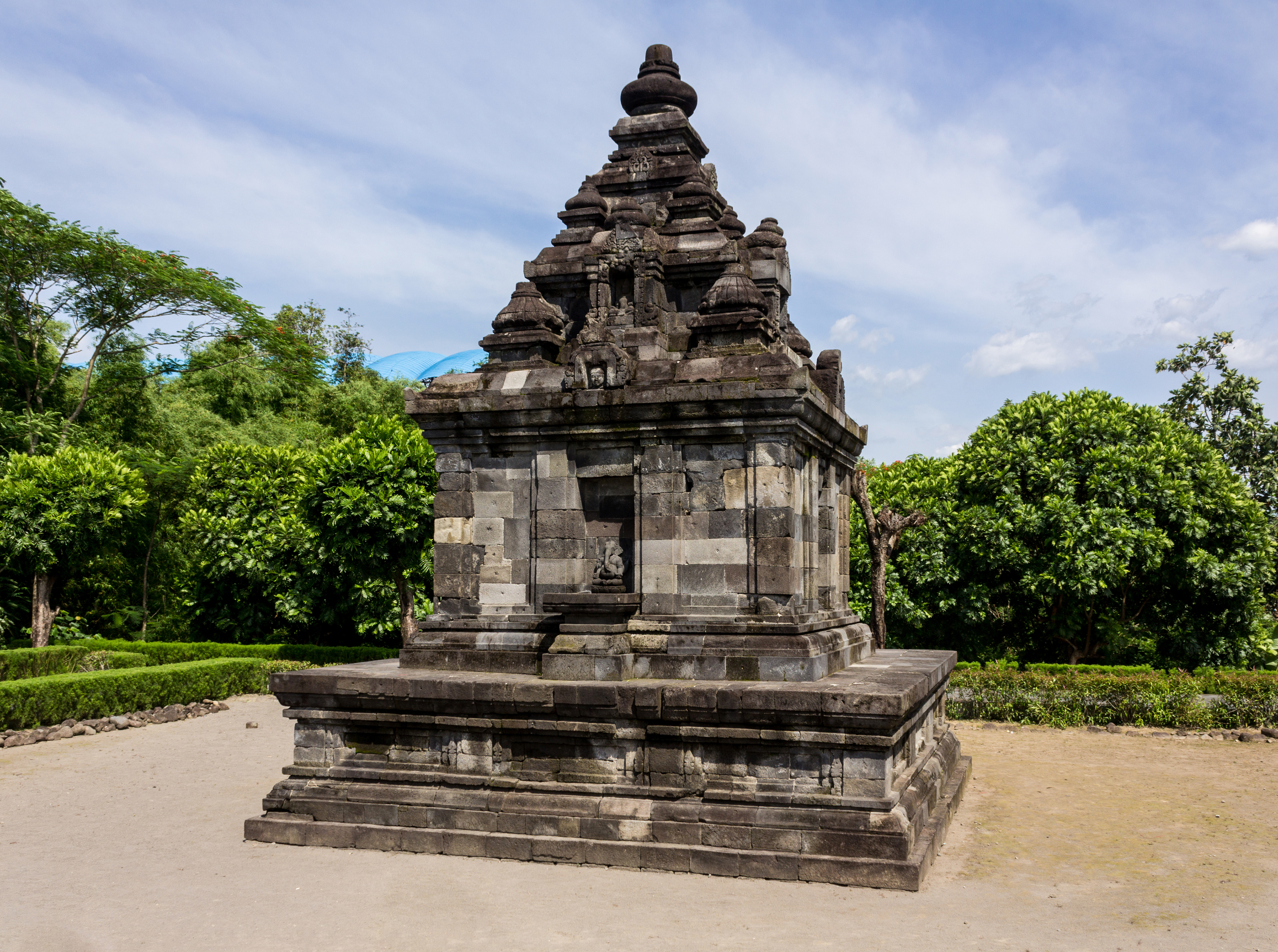
Gebang Temple viewed from southwest corner

Gebang (Indonesian: Candi Gebang; Javanese: ꦕꦤ꧀ꦝꦶꦒꦼꦧꦁ, romanized: Candhi Gebang) is an 8th-century Hindu temple located on the outskirts of Yogyakarta, Indonesia. The temple is located at Gebang hamlet, Wedomartani village, Ngemplak, Sleman Regency, Special Region of Yogyakarta. The temple was built during the Mataram kingdom.

There are no assuring historical backgrounds or inscription records concerning the temple. However the high proportion of the temple feet indicates that the temple was built in the old period of Kingdom of Mataram, c. 730 to 800.

== Discovery ==
In November 1936, a villager discovered a Ganesha statue. The Art and Archaeological Services (Oudheid Dienst) led an excavation and discovered that the Ganesha statue was part of a small stone building. The archaeological excavation was conducted that year and discovered a temple ruin, the andesite stones that parts of the roof and the base appeared to be intact. Besides the parts of the building, the excavation also yielded some artifacts such as pottery, statuettes, stone boxes (peripih), and lingam. The temple is named "Gebang" as the name of the village. During its discovery, the temple wall and roof collapsed, however, the base was still intact. The temple ruin was buried under Mount Merapi volcanic lahar sediments. The temple was reconstructed by Van Romondt from 1937 to 1939.

== Structure ==
Gebang temple displayed Hindu temple features. The square base is measured 5.25 x 5.25 metres, and the temple is 7.75 metres in height. There are no entrance stairs, or probably one was made from organic wooden material that already decayed. The temple faces east with the entrance located on the eastern side. On each side of the portal, there are two niches which were filled with statues of Nandiswara on the right side. In November 1989 the head of Nandiswara was stolen. The left niche probably hosted a Mahakala statue as the counterpart of Nandiswara, however, there was no Mahakala statue ever discovered here. In the inner chamber, there is a Yoni placed in the center of the room.

On the outer wall there are three niches on the north, south, and east sides of the temple. The north and south niches are empty, however on the west side there is a Ganesha statue sitting on a yoni with a spout. Compared to other Hindu temples in Yogyakarta vicinity, Gebang temple has a unique architectural style; on the roof, small heads of divinity appear from a window frame and male divine bodies (devata) seated in the small niches. This divinity head is called kudu. Similar roof ornament styles depicting heads of the gods also appeared on the roof of Bima temple in Dieng temples, Dieng Plateau, Central Java. The top of the temple is crowned with ratna. On the temple yard there are four pseudo-lingam on its four corners.

== See also ==
- Candi of Indonesia
- Hinduism in Java
- Indonesian Esoteric Buddhism
