= North Sumatra Museum =

- Museum Sumatera Utara
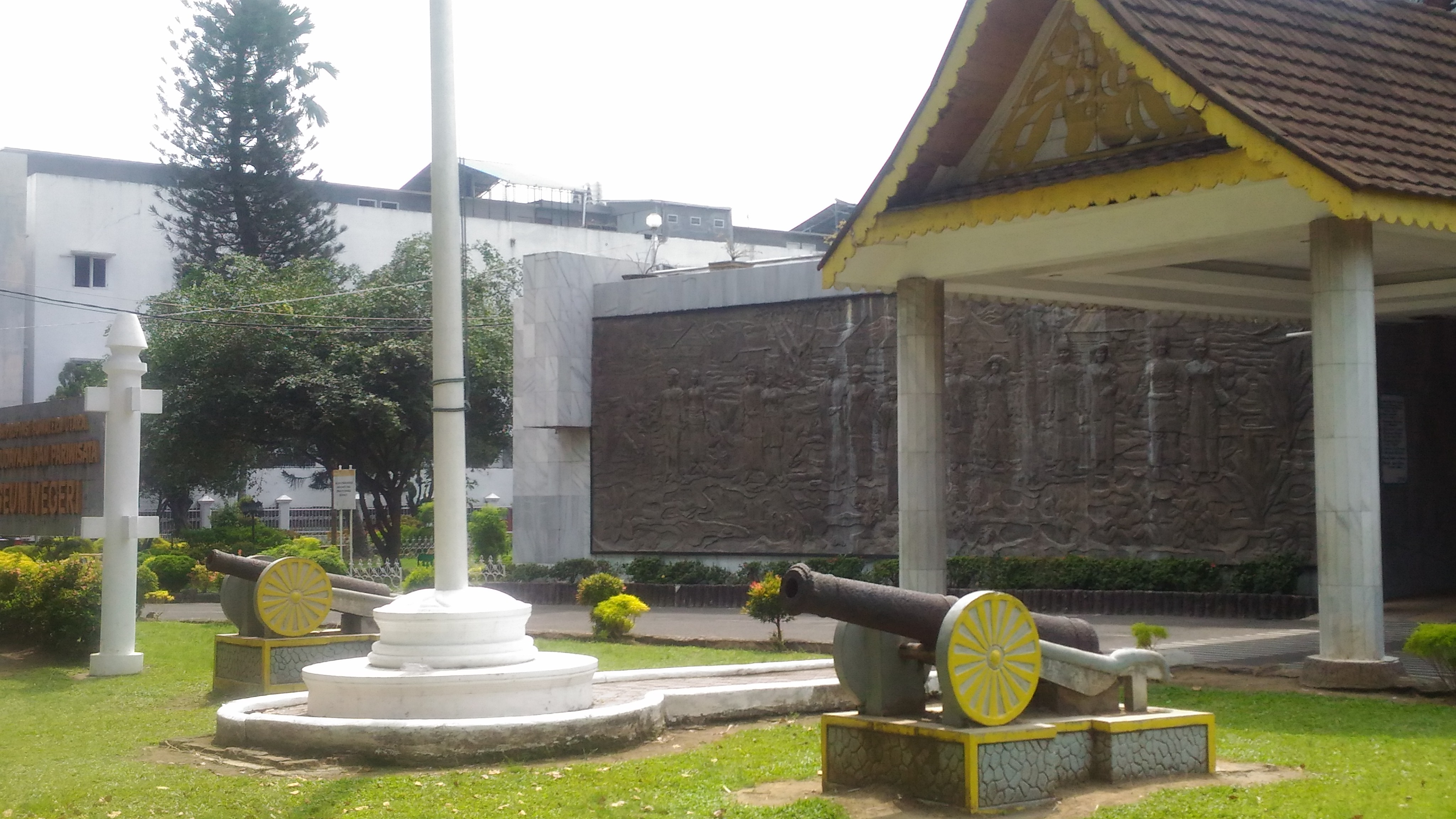
- Established: 19 April 1982
- Location: Jln. H.M. Jhoni No. 51, Medan, North Sumatra, Indonesia
- Visitors: 73.032 (in 2003); 80.070 (in 2004); 81.031 (in 2005)
- Director: Sri Hartini

The North Sumatra Museum or locally known as Northern Sumatra Museum, is a state-owned museum located along H.M Jhoni Street, Medan, Indonesia. This museum is the largest museum in North Sumatra and includes a variety of cultural heritage of Indonesia, as well as art and crafts from various ethnic groups in North Sumatra.

== Overview ==
This museum building was constructed in 1954. The museum itself was inaugurated on April 19, 1982 by the Minister of Education and Culture, Daoed Joesoef. This museum is one of the foremost museums in Indonesia.

The museum stands on an area of 10,468 m^{2} and consists of a main building of two floors which functions as a permanent exhibition space, a place for temporary exhibitions, an audio-visual room/lecture, administration, and other supportive parts of the overall arrangements.

== Collections ==
In 2005, the museum had 6,799 collection consist on animal replicas typical of Sumatra, fossil replicas of early humans, dioramas of prehistoric life, as well as a variety of prehistoric tools. Other relics such as statues of Hindu – Buddha relics, tombstones heritage, Al-Qur'an, a replica of Masjid Azizi is here, and also historical tooling around Dutch Colonial era also collected. In addition, there is also a model of colonial figures and replicas of Medan city life around past era. Collectibles include traditional and modern weapon, medicine – traditional medicine, communications equipment used against the invaders. Also featured paintings of heroism and wartime propaganda poster. Photographs and paintings of heroes and former governors of Northern Sumatra also presented.
