= Avalokiteśvara =

Buddhist bodhisattva

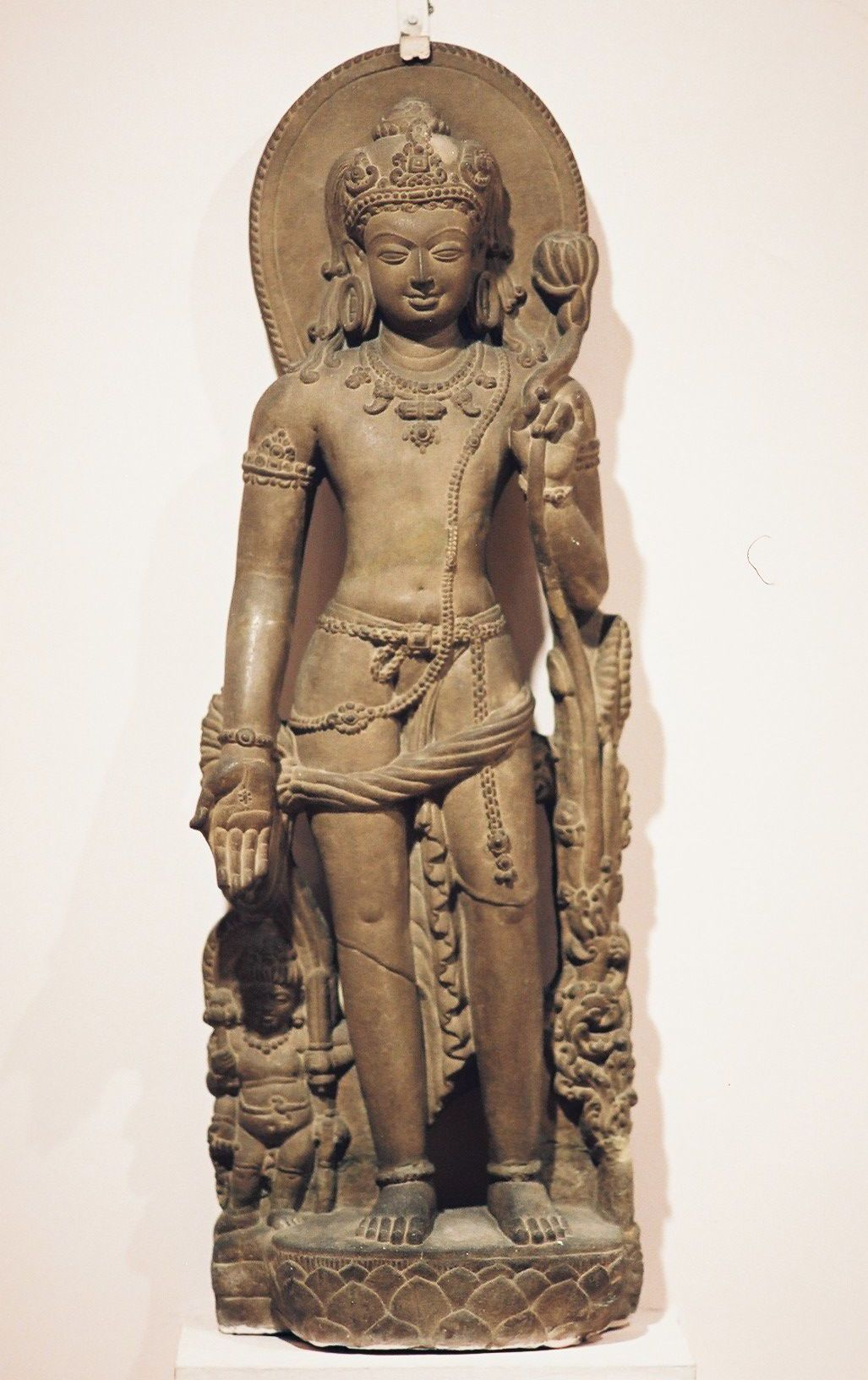
- Sculpture of Avalokiteśvara holding a lotus (padma). Nālandā, Bihar, India, 9th century CE.
- Sanskrit: अवलोकितस्वर; IAST: Avalokitasvara; अवलोकितेश्वर; IAST: Avalokiteśvara
- Burmese: လောကနတ်; IPA: /lɔ́ka̰naʔ/; ကွမ်ယင်; IPA: [kwàɴ jɪ̀ɴ]
- Chinese: 观世音, 觀世音; Pinyin: Guānshìyīn; Jyutping: Gun1 sai3 jam1; Pe̍h-ōe-jī: Koan-sè-im; Tâi-lô: Kuan-sè-im; 观音, 觀音; Pinyin: Guānyīn; Jyutping: Gun1 jam1; Pe̍h-ōe-jī: Koan-im; Tâi-lô: Kuan-im; 观自在, 觀自在; Pinyin: Guānzìzài; Jyutping: Gun1 zi6 zoi6
- Japanese: 観自在; Romaji: Kanjizai; 観音; Romaji: Kannon; 観世音; Romaji: Kanzeon
- Khmer: អវលោកេស្វរៈ; ALA-LC: ʾavalokesvarà; អវលោកិតេស្វរៈ; ALA-LC: ʾavalokitesvarà; លោកេស្វរៈ; ALA-LC: Lokesvarà
- Korean: 관음; RR: Gwaneum; 관자재; RR: Gwanjajae; 관세음; RR: Gwanseeum
- Mongolian: ᠵᠠᠨᠷᠠᠢᠰᠠᠭ᠂ ᠠᠷᠢᠶᠠᠪᠠᠯᠣ; Жанрайсаг, Арьяабал; SASM/GNC: Janraisag, Ariyabalu
- Russian: Авалокитешвара; ALA-LC: Avalokiteshvara
- Sinhala: අවලෝකිතේශ්වර; ISO 15919: Avalōkitēśvara
- Thai: อวโลกิเตศวร; RTGS: Awalokitesuan; กวนอิม; RTGS: Kuan Im
- Tibetan: སྤྱན་རས་གཟིགས: THL: Chenrézik
- Vietnamese: Quan Âm, Quán Thế Âm, Quán Tự Tại

Information
- Venerated by: Buddhism, Chinese folk religion, Taoism
- Attributes: Great Compassion

In Buddhism, Avalokiteśvara (meaning "the Lord who looks down", IPA: /ˌʌvəloʊkɪˈteɪʃvərə/), also known as Lokeśvara ("Lord of the World") and Chenrezig (in Tibetan), is a Bodhisattva associated with Great Compassion (mahākaruṇā). Avalokiteśvara has a vast number of manifestations (e.g., the 108 forms of Avalokiteśvara) and is depicted in various forms and styles across Buddhist traditions of different cultures. In some schools of Mahayana and Vajrayana Buddhism, Avalokiteśvara is also considered a manifestation of Amitabha Buddha for the purpose of Dharma teaching, and an emanation from Vairocana Buddha as an embodiment of the Miraculous Observing Wisdom (妙觀察智).

In East Asian Buddhism, Avalokiteśvara is known as 觀世音, or more commonly simply as 觀音 (simplified Chinese: 观音; pinyin: Guānyīn; Cantonese Jyutping: Gun1-jam1; Japanese: 観音; rōmaji: Kannon; Korean: 관음; romaja: Gwaneum; Vietnamese: Quan Âm). In the traditional cultures of these Asian countries, there is a female form of Avalokiteśvara depicted as a divine mother in a white robe, called White-Robed Avalokiteśvara or Southern Sea Avalokiteśvara. This female form of Avalokiteśvara is worshiped widely in East Asian religions including Taoism and Chinese folk religion.

Avalokiteśvara is also known for his popular mantra, Oṃ maṇi padme hūṃ, which is the most popular mantra in Tibetan Buddhism.

== Etymology ==
The name Avalokiteśvara combines the verbal prefix ava "down", lokita, a past participle of the verb lok "to look, notice, behold, observe", here used in an active sense, and finally īśvara, "lord", "ruler", "sovereign", or "master". In accordance with sandhi (Sanskrit rules of sound combination), a+īśvara becomes eśvara. Combined, the parts mean "lord who gazed down (at the world)". The word loka ("world") is absent from the name, but the phrase is implied. It does appear in the Cambodian form of the name, Lokesvarak.

The earliest translation of the name Avalokiteśvara into Chinese by authors such as Xuanzang was as Guānzìzài (Chinese: 觀自在; pinyin: Guān zìzài), not the form used in East Asian Buddhism today, which is Guanyin (Chinese: 觀音; pinyin: Guānyīn). It was initially thought that early translators, lacking fluency in Sanskrit, mistook Avalokiteśvara for Avalokitasvara ("who looked down upon sound", i.e., the cries of sentient beings who need help) and thus mistranslated Avalokiteśvara as Guānyīn. It is now understood that Avalokitasvara was the original form and is also the origin of Guanyin "perceiving sound, cries". This translation was favored by the tendency of some Chinese translators, notably Kumārajīva, to use the variant Guānshìyīn Chinese: 觀世音; pinyin: Guānshìyīn "who perceives the world's lamentations"—wherein lok was read as simultaneously meaning both "to look" and "world" (Sanskrit loka; Chinese: 世; pinyin: shì). The original form of Guanyin's name appears in Sanskrit fragments from the fifth century.

The original meaning of the name fits the Buddhist understanding of the role of a bodhisattva. The reinterpretation presenting him as an īśvara shows a strong influence of Hinduism, as the term īśvara was usually connected to the Hindu notion of Vishnu (in Vaishnavism) or Shiva (in Shaivism) as the Supreme Lord, Creator, and Ruler of the world. Some attributes of such a god were transmitted to the bodhisattva, but the mainstream of those who venerated Avalokiteśvara upheld the Buddhist rejection of the doctrine of any creator god.

In Sanskrit, Avalokiteśvara is also referred to as Lokeśvara ("Lord of the World"). In Tibetan, Avalokiteśvara is Chenrézig (Tibetan: སྤྱན་རས་གཟིགས་). The etymology of the Tibetan name Chenrézik is spyan "eye", ras "continuity", and gzig "to look". This gives the meaning of one who always looks upon all beings (with the eye of compassion).

== Origin ==
=== Mahayana account ===
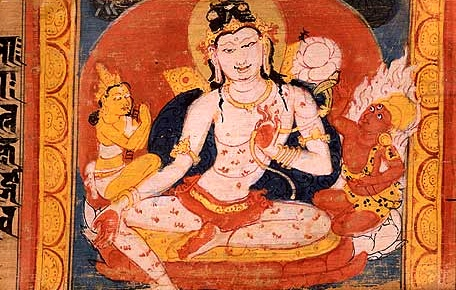
Avalokiteśvara painting from a Sanskrit palm-leaf manuscript. Nalanda, India, 12th century.

These are found in Chapter 25 of the Lotus Sutra: The Universal Gate of Bodhisattva Avalokiteśvara (Chinese: 觀世音菩薩普門品; pinyin: Guānshìyīn púsà pǔ mén pǐn). This chapter is devoted to Avalokiteśvara, describing him as a compassionate bodhisattva who hears the cries of sentient beings and who works tirelessly to help those who call upon his name. A total of 33 different manifestations of Avalokiteśvara are described, including female manifestations, all to suit the minds of various beings. The chapter consists of both a prose and a verse section. This earliest source often circulates separately as its own sutra, called the Avalokiteśvara Sūtra (Chinese: 觀世音經; pinyin: Guānshìyīn jīng), and is commonly recited or chanted at Buddhist temples in East Asia.

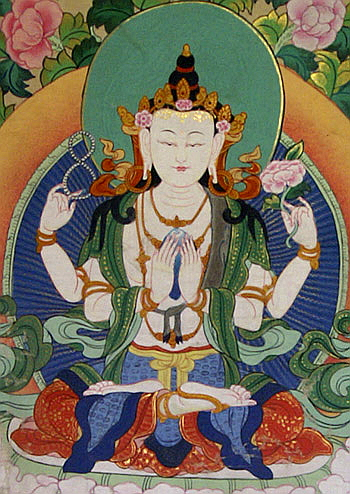
Four-armed Tibetan form of Avalokiteśvara.

When the Chinese monk Faxian traveled to Mathura in India around 400 CE, he wrote about monks presenting offerings to Avalokiteśvara. When Xuanzang traveled to India in the 7th century, he provided eyewitness accounts of Avalokiteśvara statues being venerated by devotees from all walks of life, from kings to monks to laypeople.

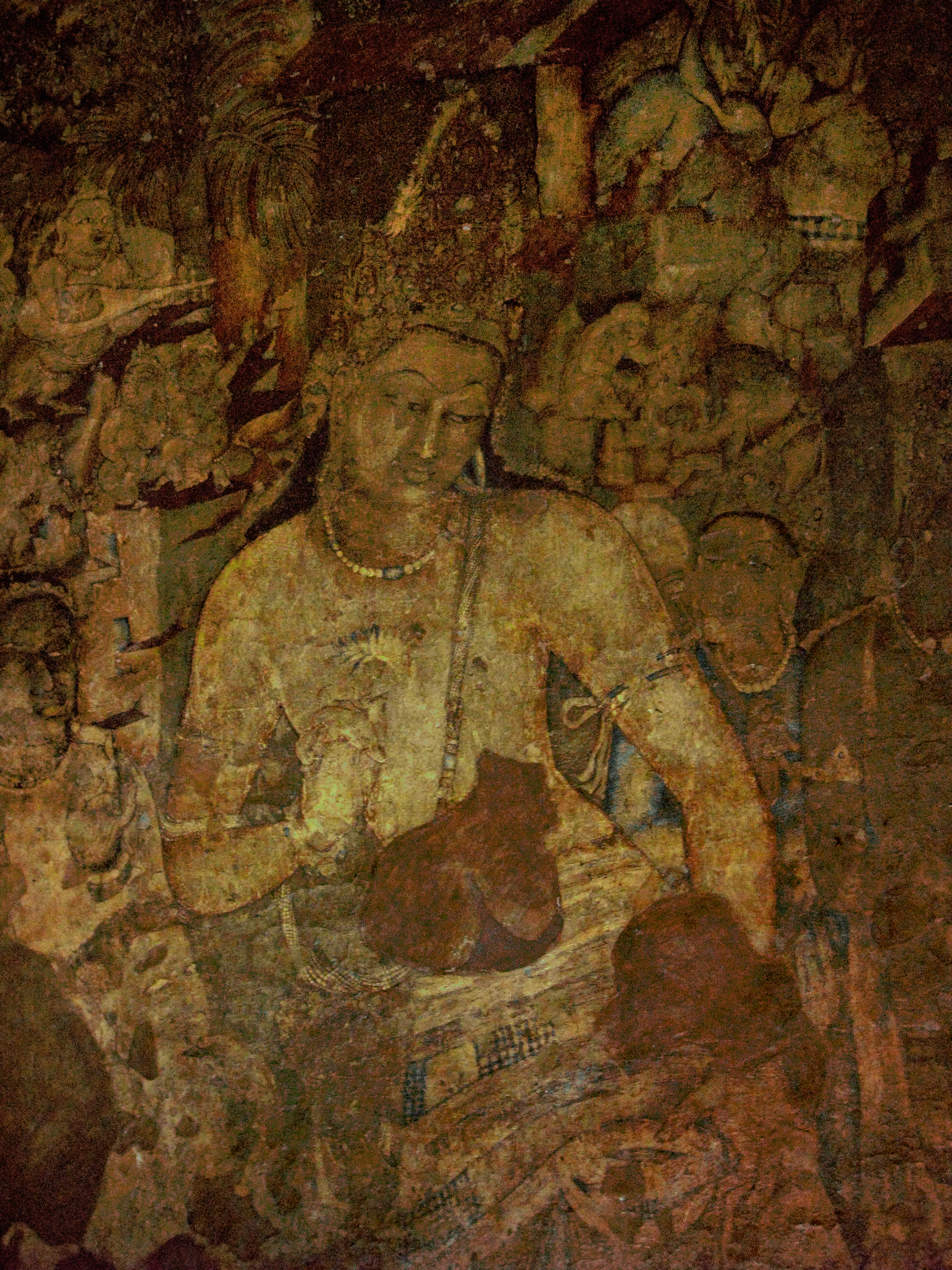
Avalokiteśvara / Padmapani, Ajanta Caves, India

In Chinese Buddhism and East Asia, Tangmi practices for the 18-armed form of Avalokiteśvara called Cundī are very popular. The popularity of Cundī is attested by the three extant translations of the Cundī Dhāraṇī Sūtra from Sanskrit to Chinese, made from the end of the seventh century to the beginning of the eighth century. In late imperial China, these early esoteric traditions still thrived in Buddhist communities. Robert Gimello has also observed that in these communities, the esoteric practices of Cundī were extremely popular among both the populace and the elite.

In the Tiantai school, six forms of Avalokiteśvara are defined. Each of the bodhisattva's six qualities is said to break the hindrances in one of the six realms of existence: hell-beings, pretas, animals, humans, asuras, and devas.

According to Nīlakaṇṭha Dhāraṇī Sūtra, Gautama Buddha told his disciple Ānanda that Avalokiteśvara had become a Buddha countless eons ago, with the name Samyaka Dharma-Vidya Tathāgata meaning "Tathāgata who clearly understands the right Dharma". Out of great compassion, he wants to help all other Bodhisattvas to achieve the highest Awakenment, and bring happiness and peacefulness to all sentient beings, therefore he appears as a Bodhisattva, taking the name Avalokiteshvara and often abides in the Sahā world.

Another Mahayana Sutra, Tathagata's Unimaginable State Sutra, reaffirms that Avalokiteśvara is actually a Buddha. In the Sutra it is written that when Sakyamuni Buddha attained the highest Awakenment, countless Buddhas from other worlds, appearing as Bodhisattvas, came to our world to congratulate him and assist his Dharma-teaching work, and Avalokiteśvara was one of those Buddhas who appeared as Bodhisattvas.

In Mahayana Buddhism, Avalokiteśvara is one of the Four Great Bodhisattvas (四大菩薩) who are Mañjuśrī, Samantabhadra, Avalokiteśvara, and Kṣitigarbha. Avalokiteśvara is also a close assistant of Amitabha Buddha, helping Amitabha Buddha to preach the Dharma of the Pure Land.

=== Theravāda account ===
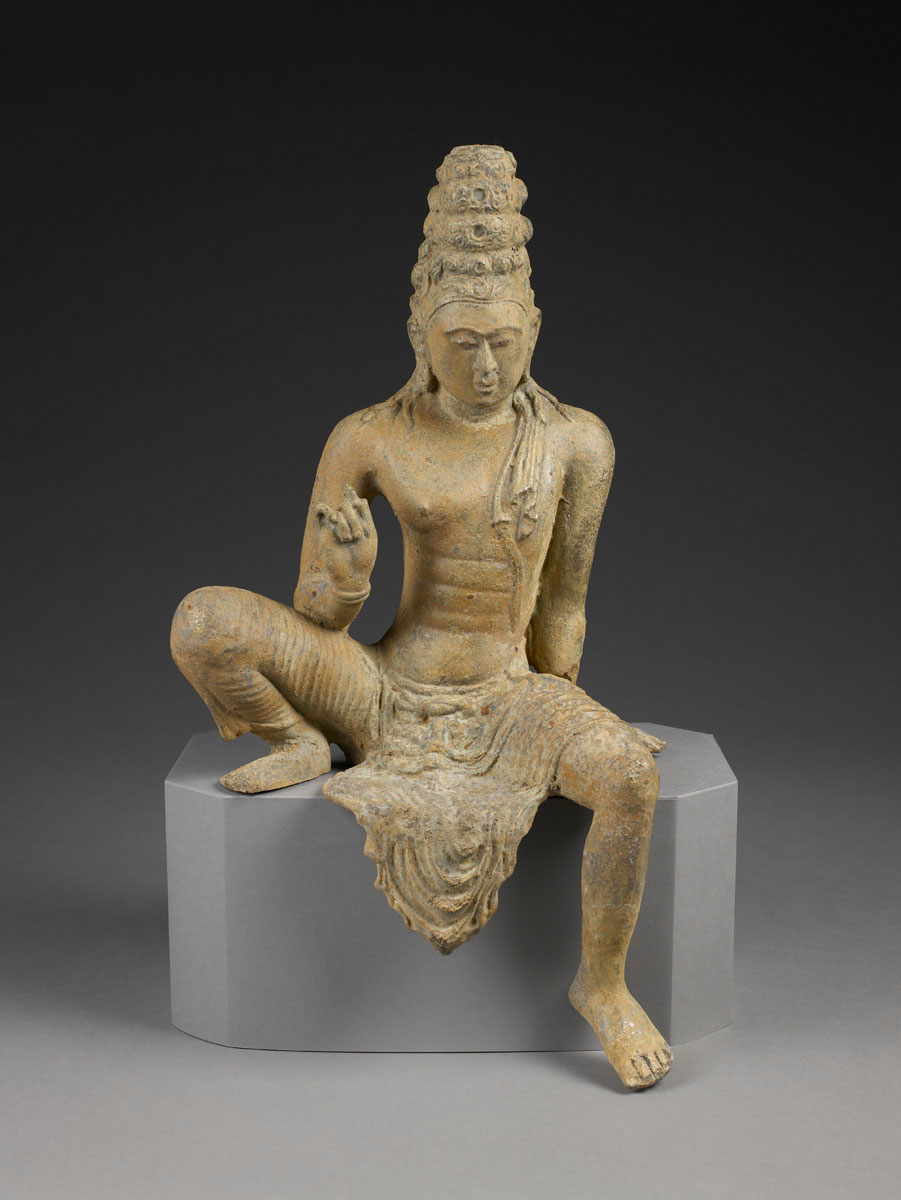
Bronze statue of Avalokiteśvara from Sri Lanka, c. 750 CE

Veneration of Avalokiteśvara Bodhisattva has continued to the present day in Sri Lanka.

In times past, both Tantrayana and Mahayana have been found in some of the Theravada countries, but today the Buddhism of Sri Lanka (formerly Ceylon), Myanmar (formerly Burma), Thailand, Laos, and Cambodia is almost exclusively Theravada, based on the Pali Canon. The only Mahayana deity that has entered the worship of ordinary Buddhists in Theravada Buddhism is Bodhisattva Avalokitesvara. In Sri Lanka, he is known as Natha-deva and is believed by the majority to be the Buddha yet to come, Bodhisattva Maitreya. The figure of Avalokitesvara is usually found in the shrine room near the Buddha image.

In more recent times, some western-educated Theravādins have attempted to identify Nātha with Maitreya Bodhisattva; however, traditions and basic iconography (including an image of Amitābha Buddha on the front of the crown) identify Nātha as Avalokiteśvara. Andrew Skilton writes:

... It is clear from sculptural evidence alone that the Mahāyāna was fairly widespread throughout Sri Lanka, although the modern account of the history of Buddhism on the island presents an unbroken and pure lineage of Theravāda. (One can only assume that similar trends were transmitted to other parts of Southeast Asia with Sri Lankan ordination lineages.) Relics of an extensive cult of Avalokiteśvara can be seen in the present-day figure of Nātha.

Avalokiteśvara is popularly worshipped in Myanmar, where he is called Lokanat or lokabyuharnat, and Thailand, where he is called Lokesvara. The bodhisattva goes by many other names. In Indochina and Thailand, he is Lokesvara, "The Lord of the World". In Tibet, he is Chenrezig, also spelled Spyan-ras gzigs, "With a Pitying Look". In China, the bodhisattva takes a female form and is called Guanyin (also spelled Kwan Yin, Kuanyin, or Kwun Yum), "Hearing the Sounds of the World". In Japan, Guanyin is Kannon or Kanzeon; in Korea, Gwaneum; and in Vietnam, Quan Am.

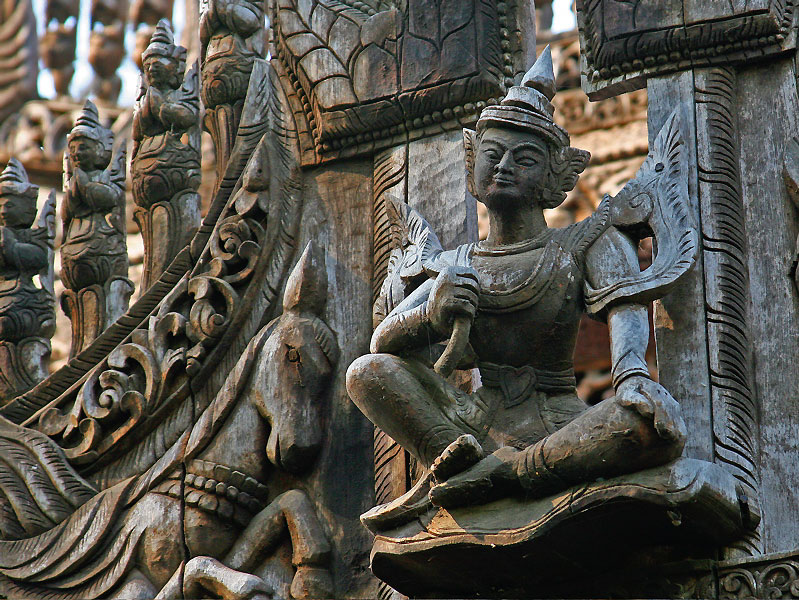
Wood carving of Lokanat at Shwenandaw Monastery, Mandalay, Burma

=== Modern scholarship ===
Avalokiteśvara is worshipped as Nātha in Sri Lanka. The Tamil Buddhist tradition developed in Chola literature, such as Buddamitra's Virasoliyam, states that the Vedic sage Agastya learned Tamil from Avalokiteśvara. The earlier Chinese traveler Xuanzang recorded a temple dedicated to Avalokitesvara in the south Indian Mount Potalaka, a Sanskritization of Pothigai, where Tamil Hindu tradition places Agastya as having learned the Tamil language from Shiva. Avalokitesvara worship gained popularity with the growth of the Abhayagiri vihāra's Tamraparniyan Mahayana sect.

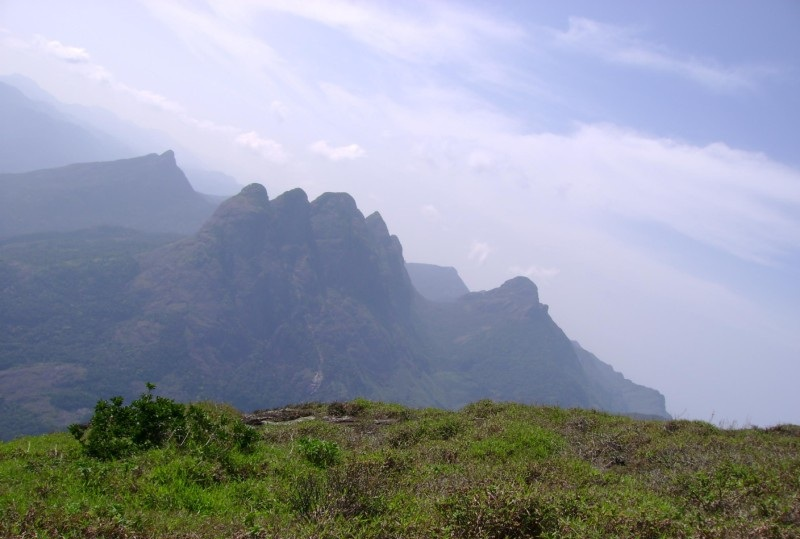
Pothigai Malai in Tamil Nadu is proposed as the original Mount Potalaka in India.

Western scholars have not reached a consensus on the origin of the reverence for Avalokiteśvara. Some have suggested that Avalokiteśvara, along with many other supernatural beings in Buddhism, was a borrowing or absorption by Mahayana Buddhism of one or more deities from Hinduism, in particular Shiva or Vishnu. This seems to be based on the name Avalokiteśvara.

On the basis of Buddhist scriptures, ancient Tamil literary sources, and field surveys, Japanese scholar Shu Hikosaka proposes the hypothesis that ancient Mount Potalaka, the residence of Avalokiteśvara described in the Gaṇḍavyūha Sūtra and Xuanzang's Great Tang Records on the Western Regions, is Mount Potigai in Ambasamudram, Tirunelveli, at the Tamil Nadu-Kerala border. Shu also said that Mount Potalaka has been a sacred place for the people of South India since time immemorial. It is the traditional residence of Siddhar Agastya at Agastya Mala. With the spread of Buddhism in the region beginning at the time of the great king Aśoka in the third century BCE, it became a holy place also for Buddhists, who gradually became dominant as a number of their hermits settled there. The local people, though, mainly remained followers of the Tamil animist religion. The mixed Tamil-Buddhist cult culminated in the formation of the figure of Avalokiteśvara.

The name Lokeśvara should not be confused with that of Lokeśvararāja, the Buddha under whom Dharmakara became a monk and made forty-eight vows before becoming Amitābha.

Avalokiteśvara's six armed manifestation as Cintāmaṇicakra is also widely venerated in East Asia. The Cintāmaṇicakra Dharani (Chinese: 如意寶輪王陀羅尼; pinyin: Rúyì Bǎolún Wáng Tuóluóní) is another popular dharani associated with the bodhisattva.

== Manifestations ==
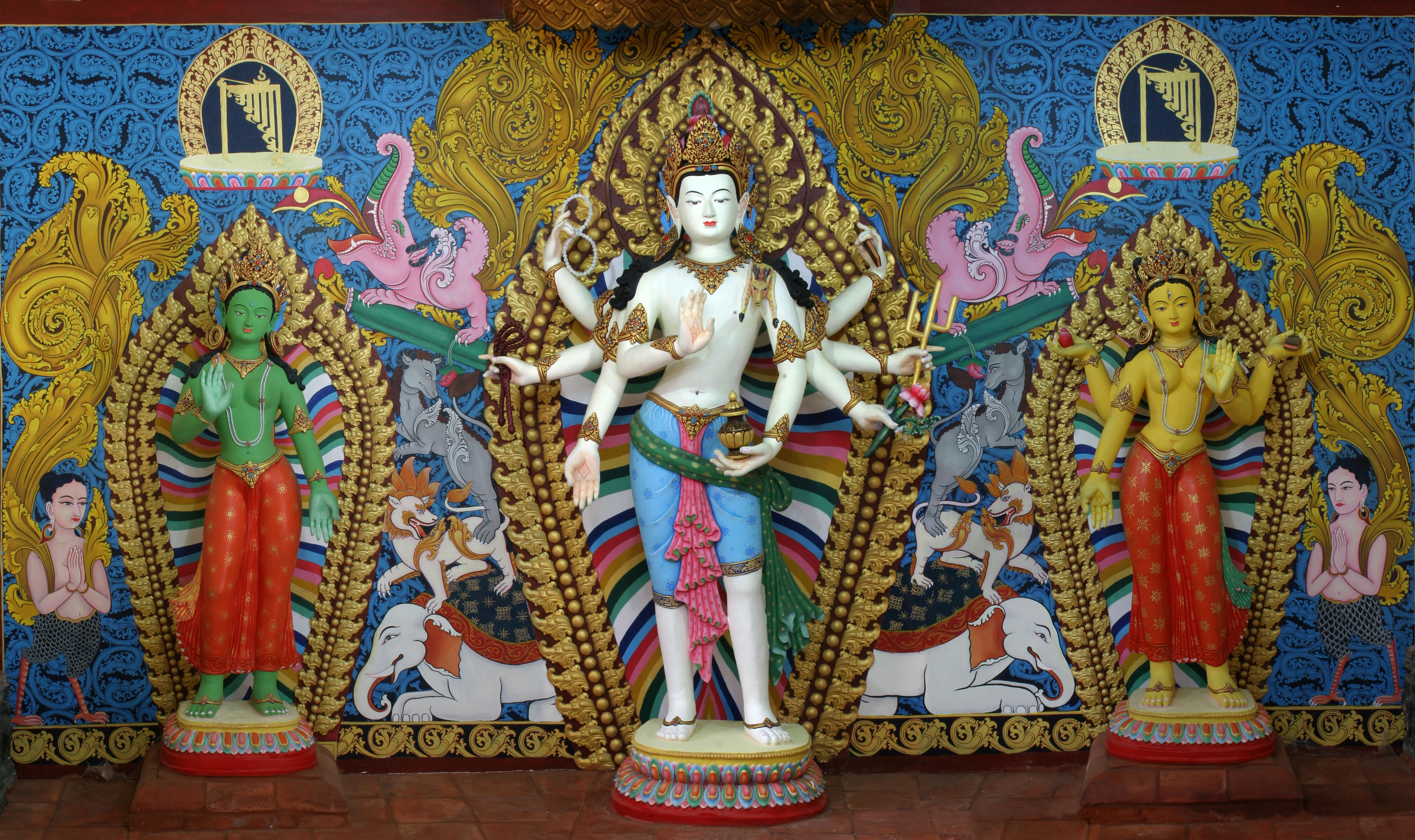
Clay images of Amoghapasha Lokesvara flanked by Arya Tara and Bhrikuti Tara enshrined at the side wing of Vasuccha Shil Mahavihar, Guita Bahi, Patan: This set of images is popular in traditional monasteries of Kathmandu Valley, Nepal.

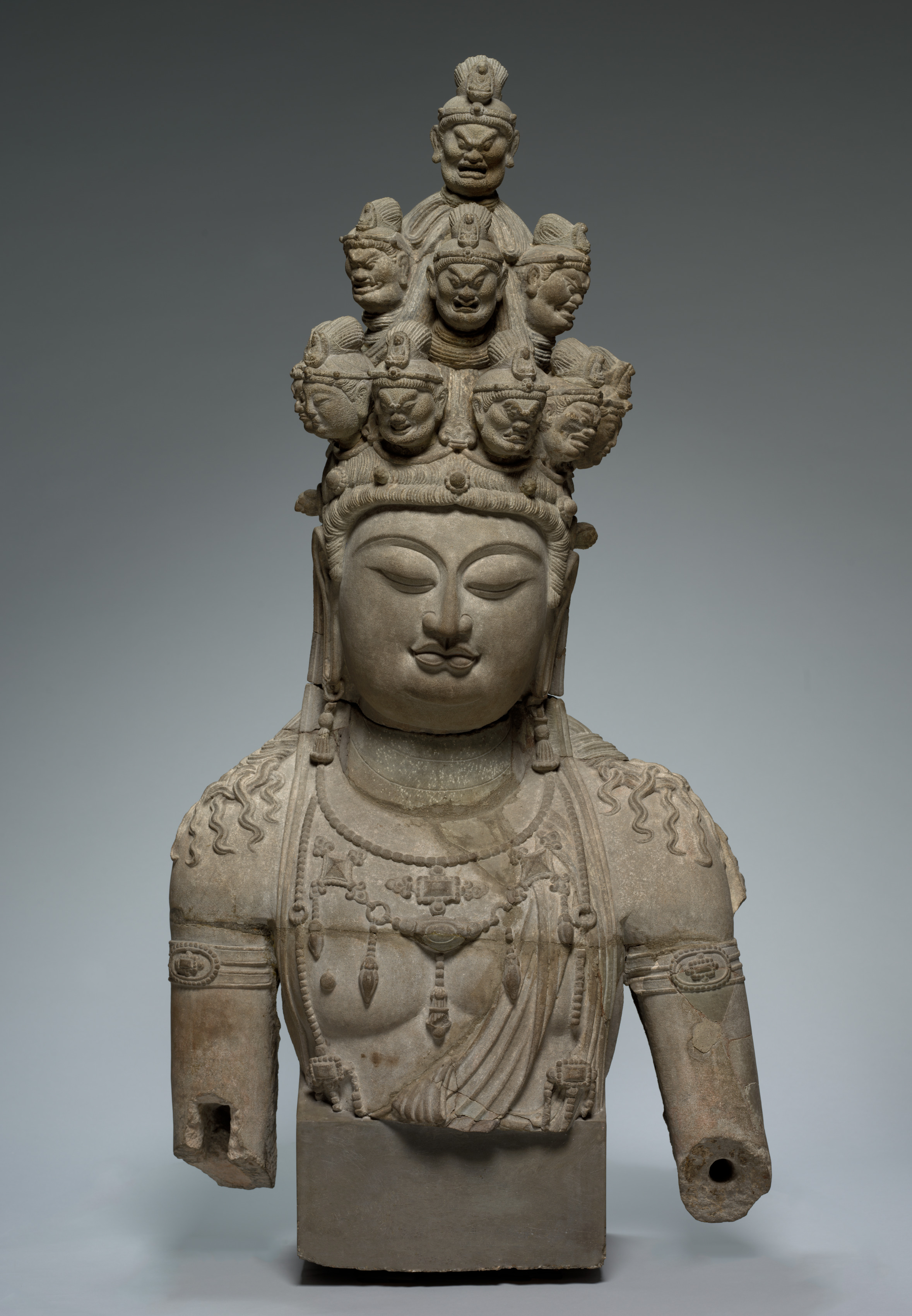
Chinese Tang dynasty (618–907) statue of Ekādaśamukha (Eleven faced) Avalokiteśvara

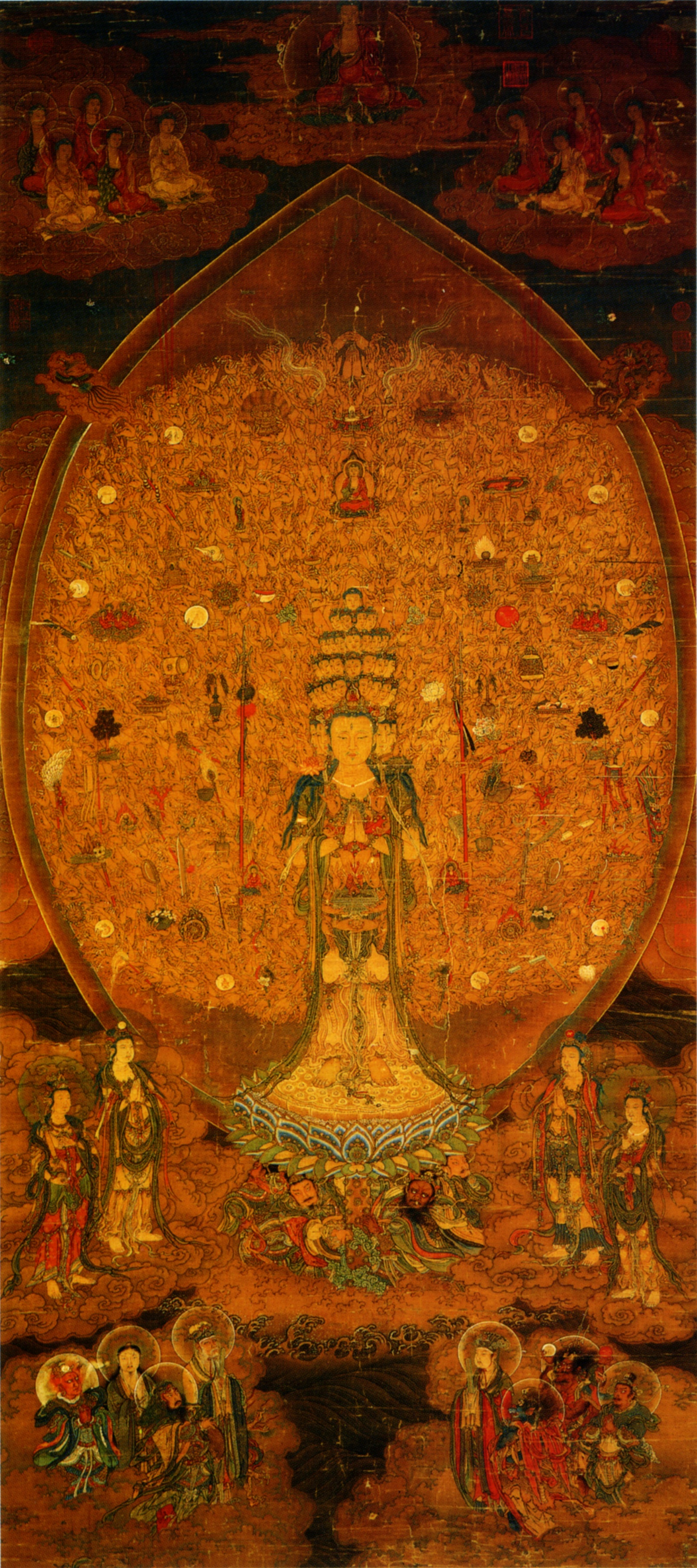
Song dynasty (960-1279) painting of the Thousand-Armed Avalokiteśvara. Avalokiteśvara is depicted with a total of 32 heads, with the topmost head being that of the Buddha Amitābha. He stands atop a lotus pedestal supported by the Four Heavenly Kings with two attendant bodhisattvas flanking him on each side, while the Eight Legions of Devas and Nāgas stand before him with their hands clasped in reverence. A group of Buddhas sit in the clouds above. Ink and colors on silk. 79.2 x 176.8 cm. Held at the National Palace Museum in Taiwan.

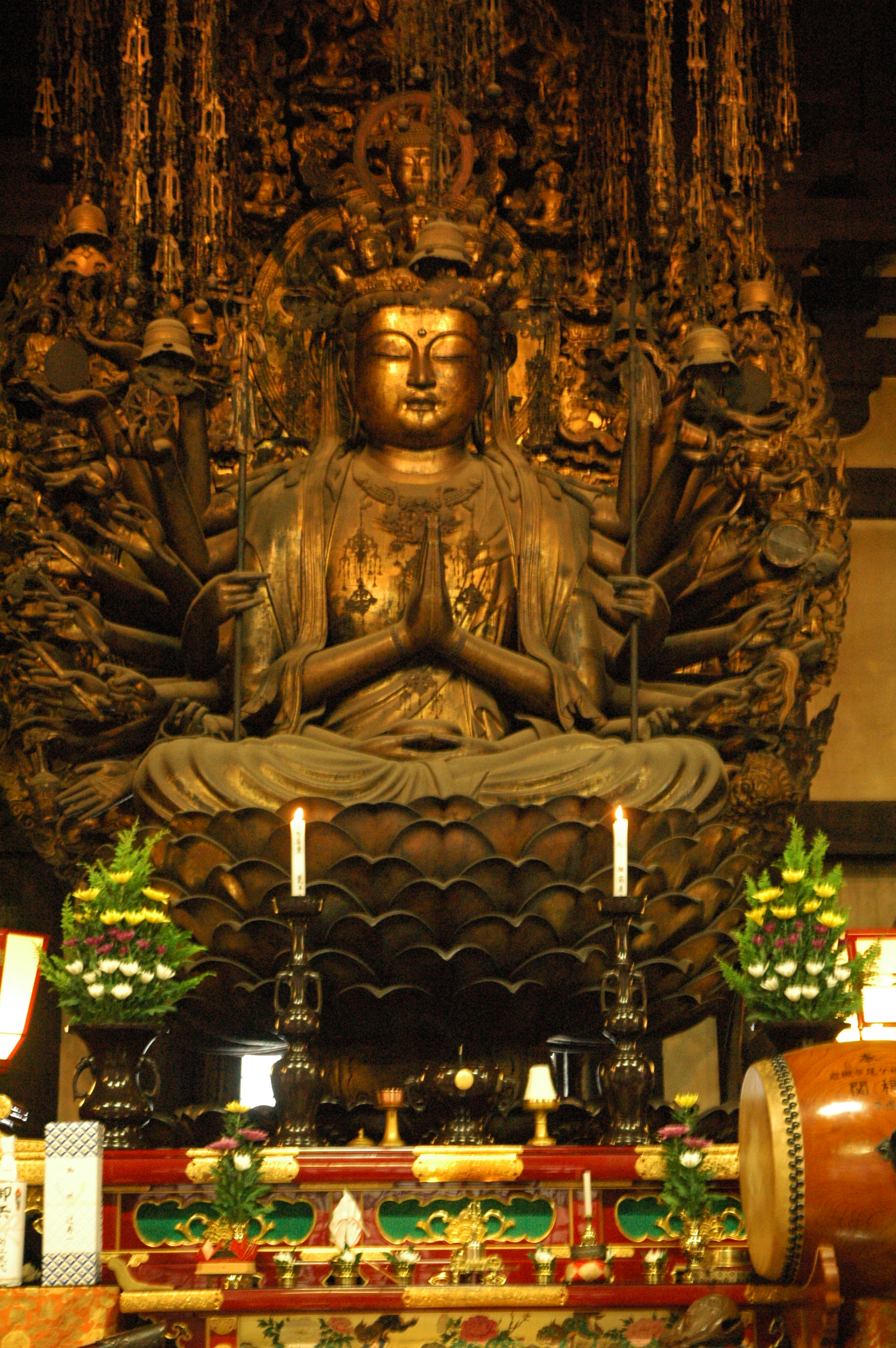
Statue of Thousand-Armed Avalokiteśvara in Sanjūsangen-dō, Kyoto, Japan.

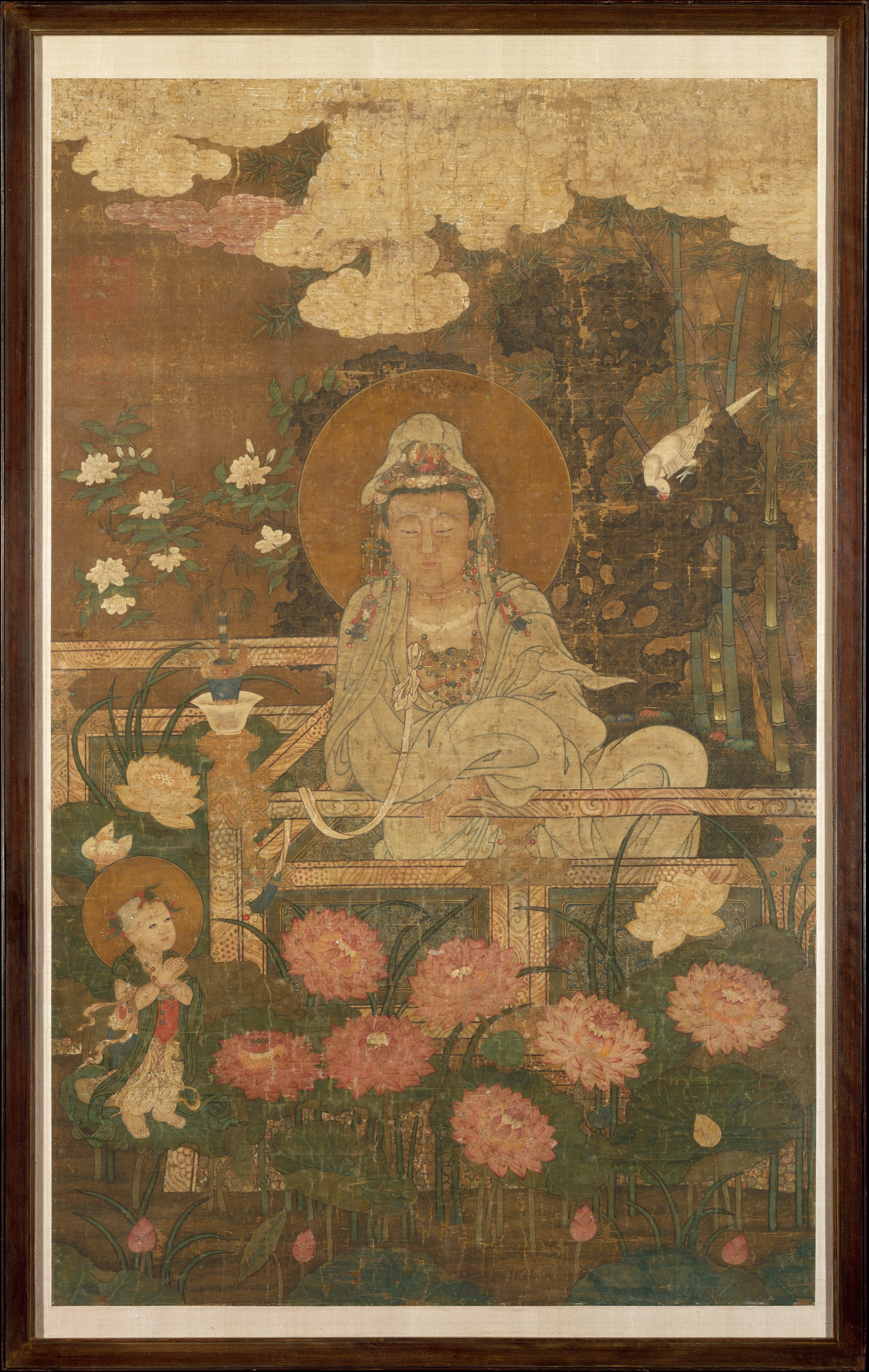
White-Robed Avalokiteśvara with nine lotus

Avalokiteśvara has an extraordinarily large number of forms, emanations or manifestations, including wisdom goddesses (vidyās) directly associated with him in images and texts.

Furthermore, at least two separate female Buddhist deities, Cundī and Tara also later came to be associated with Avalokiteśvara (and were even seen as manifestations of him).

According to Śūraṅgama Sūtra, Avalokiteśvara Bodhisattva had achieved perfect mastery of Buddhist Dharma and hence can manifest countless forms with different numbers of heads, arms and eyes.

=== Commonly seen forms ===
Some of the more commonly mentioned forms include:

Ārya Avalokitesvara	Noble Avalokitesvara (Sanskrit: Ārya-Avalokiteśvara; Chinese: 聖觀自在菩薩) is the root form of Avalokiteśvara. According to Mahayana Sublime Treasure King Sutra, Noble Avalokitesvara Bodhisattva gave birth to the Sun and the Moon from his eyes, and gave birth to many great deities from different locations of his body. The Bodhisattva's body is of super-cosmic scale, in every pore of his body there is a boundless pure world within which innumerable Buddhas, Bodhisattvas or sentient beings reside.
Four-Armed Avalokitesvara	Four-Armed Avalokitesvara Bodhisattva (Sanskrit: Catur-bhuja Avalokiteśvara; Chinese: 四臂觀音) is the Original Lord of Om Mani Padme Hum. This form of the Bodhisattva has four arms, two of them in anjali, one hand holds a lotus, the other hand holds a mala. This form is also called Sadakṣarī-Lokeśvara and is considered to be the embodiment of the Six Syllable Dharani.
Thousand-Armed Thousand-Eyed Avalokitesvara	Thousand-Armed Thousand-Eyed Avalokitesvara (Sanskrit: Sahasra-bhuja Sahasra-netra Avalokiteśvara; Chinese: 千手千眼觀音) is the Original Lord of Great Compassion Dharani. This form of the Bodhisattva is often depicted as having eleven heads and countless arms with eyes on the palms, and is called Eleven-faced Thousand-Armed and Thousand-Eyed Avalokitesvara Bodhisattva. According to Great Compassion Dharani Sutra, Avalokitesvara Bodhisattva had achieved Buddhahood countless eons ago, but out of compassion, he appears as a Bodhisattva to save living beings.
Southern Sea Avalokitesvara	Southern Sea Avalokitesvara (Chinese: 南海觀音) is a female appearance of Avalokitesvara popular in East Asia. Many other forms of the Bodhisattva such as White Robe Avalokitesvara(白衣觀音), Children-giving Avalokitesvara(送子觀音), Water-Moon Avalokitesvara(水月觀音), etc., are based on this form.
Eleven-faced Avalokitesvara	Eleven-faced Avalokitesvara (Sanskrit: Ekādaśa-mukha Avalokiteśvara; Chinese: 十一面觀音) is an appearance of the Bodhisattva that has eleven heads. The ten heads atop the Bodhisattva's head awaken living beings in the ten realms of existence.
Blue-necked Avalokitesvara	Blue-necked Avalokitesvara (Sanskrit: Nīlakaṇṭha Avalokiteśvara; Chinese: 青頸觀音) is a form of Avalokitesvara whose neck is blue in color. In order to protect living beings the Bodhisattva swallowed poison sprayed by a demon, causing his neck to turn blue.
Wish Fulfilling Wheel Avalokitesvara Bodhisattva	Wish Fulfilling Wheel Avalokitesvara (Sanskrit: Cintā-maṇi-cakra Avalokiteśvara; Chinese: 如意輪觀音) is a manifestation of Avalokitesvara that turns the Dharma Wheel to awaken living beings while granting them wishes.
Infallible lasso Avalokitesvara	Infallible lasso Avalokitesvara (Sanskrit: Amogha-pāśa Avalokiteśvara; Chinese: 不空羂索觀音) is a powerful savior who uses his infallible lasso to capture living beings drifting in the ocean of suffering and settle them on the shore of Liberation. This manifestation of the Bodhisattva is widely worshiped across different Buddhist traditions and is categorized as one of the Six forms of Avalokitesvara in Tendai school. The popular Mantra of Light is associated with Amoghapāśa, and is found in numerous Amoghapāśa sūtras.
Lion's Roar Avalokitesvara	Lion's Roar Avalokitesvara (Sanskrit: Siṃhanāda Avalokiteśvara; Chinese: 獅吼觀音) is a form of Avalokitesvara riding a roaring lion.
Lotus Hand Bodhisattva	Lotus Hand Bodhisattva (Sanskrit: Padma-pani; Chinese: 蓮華手菩薩) is another name for Avalokitesvara. This form of the Bodhisattva is often depicted as holding a vase or a lotus in his hand.
Horse Head Wisdom King	Horse Head Wisdom King (Sanskrit: Hayagrīva; Chinese: 馬頭明王) is a wrathful manifestation of Avalokitesvara Bodhisattva, also known as Horse Head Vajra (馬頭金剛) and Horse Head Avalokitesvara (馬頭觀音).
Creator Avalokitesvara	Creator Avalokitesvara (Sanskrit: Sṛṣṭikartā-Lokeśvara or Śṛṣṭikānta-Lokeśvara) is a super-cosmic manifestation of Avalokiteśvara that emanates all heavenly gods from his body during the process of creation. This form of Avalokitesvara is worshiped in Nepalese Buddhism and is the same as Saint Avalokitesvara in Mahayana Buddhism.
Triple Hari Riding Avalokitesvara	Triple Hari Riding Avalokitesvara (Sanskrit: Hariharihari-vāhana-Lokeśvara) is a form of Avalokitesvara popular in Nepalese Buddhism. In this manifestation Avalokitesvara sits on the shoulders of Vishnu, who rides his mount Garuda, who is carried by a lion. The three Haris (Vishnu, Garuda, and the lion) serve as three great vehicles (towards Awakenment), and Avalokitesvara is above all of them, symbolizing that his Way to the Ultimate Awakenment is superior to all the others.

=== Some other forms ===
Sanskrit name	Meaning	Description
Jinasagara Avalokiteśvara	Ocean of conquerors, also known as "Red Chenrezig" or Rakta Lokesvarà	A Vajrayana alternate form, often depicted with a female consort Rakta Tara Devi
Khasarpaṇi Lokeśvara	"Sky flyer" Lokeśvara	White, two harms, holds a lotus
Trailokyavaśankara	Being who Fascinated all three world realms of existence (Human loka, Divya loka, Brahma loka)	
Ashtabaya	Being who destroyed and defeated all Great 8 Fears of world	
Śvetabhagavat	White Lord of All, The One who has the most beautiful white body color and white radiances with luminous	
Udakaśrī	Auspicious Water of 4 Great Ocean in 4 Continents of Manussa loka	
Lokanātha Kala Lokeshvara	Lord of all worlds Black Lokeshvara	A wrathful tantric form with 12 arms

=== Thousand-armed Avalokiteśvara ===
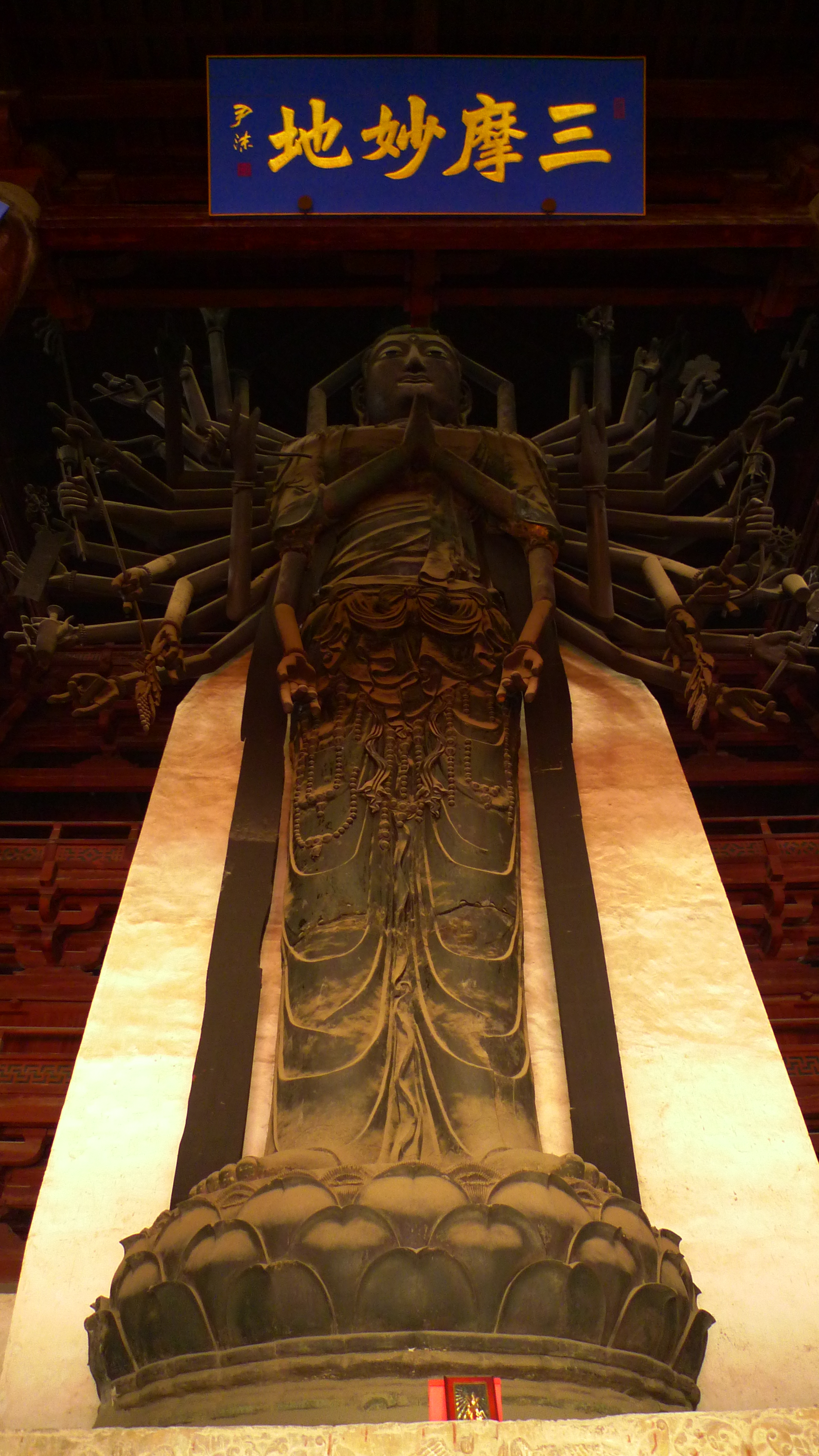
Colossal bronze Song dynasty (960–1279) statue of Qianshou Guanyin (Sahrasasbhuja Avalokiteśvara) located at the Tower of Great Compassion of Longxing Temple in Hebei, China.

One prominent Buddhist story tells of Avalokiteśvara vowing never to rest until he had freed all sentient beings from saṃsāra. Despite strenuous effort, he realizes that many unhappy beings were yet to be saved. After struggling to comprehend the needs of so many, his head splits into eleven pieces. Amitābha, seeing his plight, gives him eleven heads with which to hear the cries of the suffering. Upon hearing these cries and comprehending them, Avalokiteśvara tries to reach out to all those who needed aid, but found that his two arms shattered into pieces. Once more, Amitābha comes to his aid and invests him with a thousand arms with which to aid the suffering multitudes.

This manifestation of Avalokiteśvara is known as Sahrasasbhuja Avalokiteśvara ("Thousand-armed Avalokiteśvara), and is among the bodhisattva's most popular iconographic forms across China, Japan and Korea.

=== Avalokiteśvara as a cosmic maheśvara ("Great Lord of Creation") ===
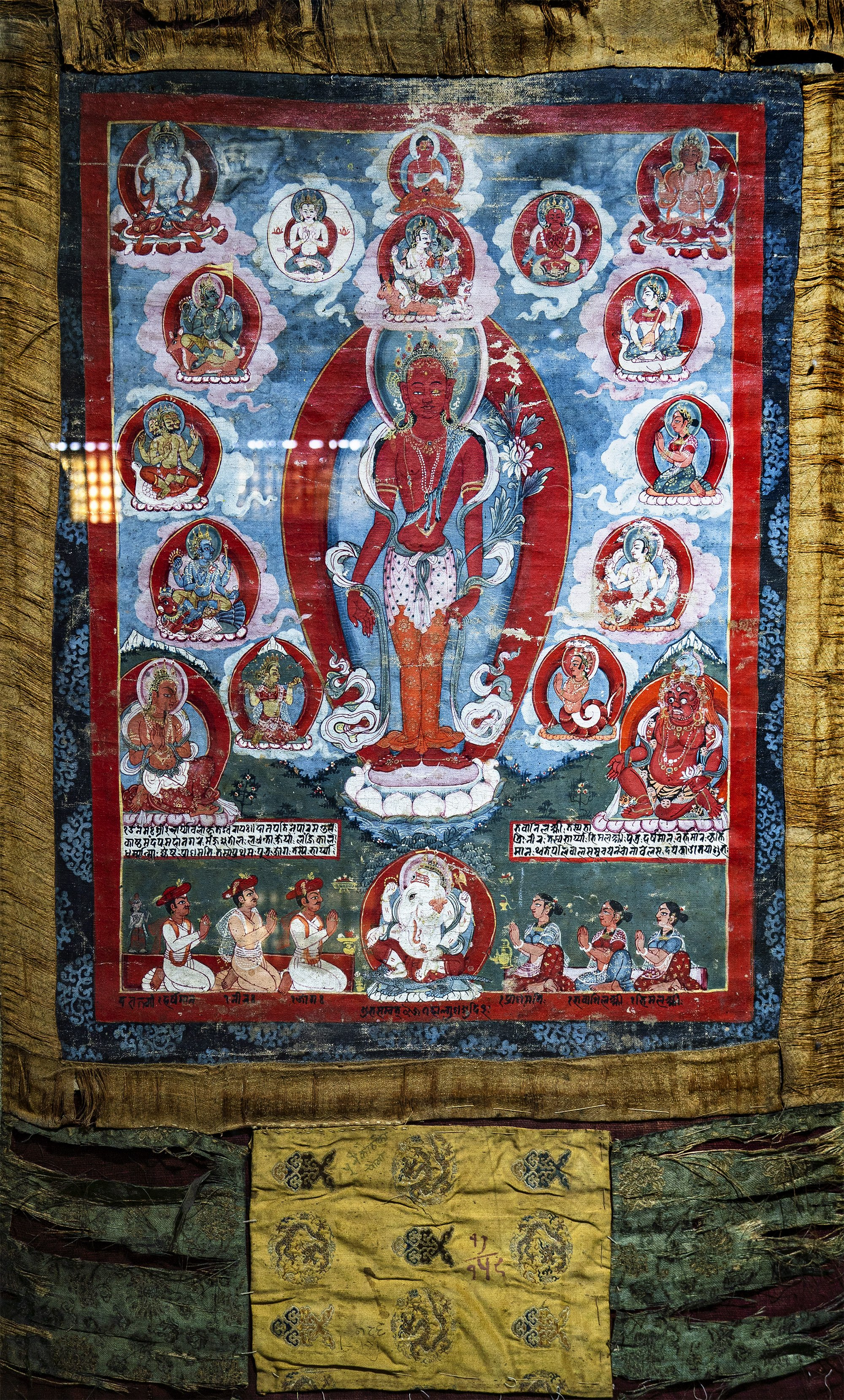
Sṛṣṭikartā Lokeśvara (Avalokiteshvara in the process of creation), in which the bodhisattva takes on the form of Sṛṣṭikartā (creator) and emanates all the Hindu gods for the benefit of sentient beings

According to various Mahayana sources, numerous Hindu deities are considered to be emanations of Avalokiteshvara. For example, in the Kāraṇḍavyūhasūtra (4th–5th century CE), Great universal deities called Vishnu, Shiva, Brahma and Saraswati are all said to have emerged from Avalokiteshvara bodhisattva's body. The passage states:

Āditya and Candra came from his eyes, Maheśvara came from his forehead, Brahmā came from his shoulders, Nārāyaṇa came from his heart, Devi Sarasvatī came from his canines, Vāyu came from his mouth, Dharaṇī came from his feet, and Varuṇa came from his stomach.

In a similar manner, Hindu deities like Nīlakaṇṭha and Harihara are cited in the Nīlakaṇṭha Dhāraṇī, possibly as forms of Avalokiteshvara or as associated bodhisattvas (the text is not clear, though traditionally these have been interpreted as various names or forms of Avalokiteshvara).

Alexander Studholme writes that these sources are influenced by Puranic Hinduism, and its concepts of an Īśvara ("lord") and Maheśvara ("great lord"), both of which are terms that refer to a transcendent and all pervasive being. The name Maheśvara is also applied to Avalokiteshvara three times in the Kāraṇḍavyūhasūtra, and some passages he is described as a cosmic man, similar to how the Puranas depict Vishnu or Shiva. However, this Buddhist myth only focuses on how Avalokiteshvara gives birth to all the gods (devas), and he is not depicted as a true Creator God (who creates the cosmos, like the Hindu Īśvara), instead he is depicted as a great cosmic being that manifests in myriad ways as a skillful means to guide living beings to Buddhahood.

== Mantras and Dharanis ==
OṂ MAŅI PADME HǕṂ. The six syllable mantra of Avalokiteśvara written in the Tibetan alphabet.

There are various mantras and dharanis associated with Avalokiteśvara.

=== Mani mantra ===
In Tibetan Buddhism, the central mantra is the six-syllable mantra Oṃ maṇi padme hūṃ (Sanskrit: ॐ मणि पद्मे हूँ, also called the Mani mantra. Due to his association with this mantra, one form of Avalokiteśvara is called Ṣaḍākṣarī ("Lord of the Six Syllables") in Sanskrit. The Mani mantra is also popular in East Asian Mahayana, such as Chinese Buddhism. There are also different variations of the mani mantra, the most common which is Oṃ maṇi padme hūṃ hrīḥ. Hrīḥ is the seed syllable of the Lotus Buddha family and the Buddha Amitabha.

Recitation of this mantra while using prayer beads is the most popular religious practice in Tibetan Buddhism. Another popular religious practice associated with om mani padme hum is the spinning of prayer wheels clockwise, which contains numerous repetitions of this mantra and effectively benefits everyone within the vicinity of the practitioner.

The connection between this famous mantra and Avalokiteśvara is documented for the first time in the Kāraṇḍavyūhasūtra. This text is dated to around the late 4th century CE to the early 5th century CE. In this sūtra, a bodhisattva is told by the Buddha that recitation of this mantra while focusing on the sound can lead to the attainment of eight hundred samādhis.

=== Ārolik mantra ===
Another mantra for Avalokiteśvara commonly recited in East Asian Buddhism is "three and a half syllables" (ardhacaturthākṣara) heart-mantra: "oṃ ārolik svāha" (or sometimes just Ārolik or oṁ ārolik), which is found (in many forms and variations like ārolika, arulika, etc.) in numerous pre-tenth-century Indian texts, including the 7th century Chinese translation of the Dhāraṇīsaṁgraha, the Susiddhikarasūtra, the Mañjuśriyamūlakalpa, and the Guhyasamājatantra.

In Chinese Buddhism, this mantra is known as "Avalokiteśvara's mantra for eradicating karmic obstructions" (Chinese: 觀世音菩薩滅業障真言, pinyin: Guānshìyīn púsà miè yèzhàng zhēnyán) and is typically recited everyday as part of the standard liturgy during the daily Mengshan Shishi ritual (Chinese: 蒙山施食; pinyin: Méngshān shīshí; lit. 'Mengshan food-bestowal') carried out in all Chinese Buddhist monasteries. In Shingon Buddhism, this mantra is the main mantra for Avalokiteśvara, and it is also considered to be the main mantra of the Lotus Buddha family.

One text (Taisho Tripitaka no. 1031) describes a visualization practice done after reciting oṁ ārolik svāhā seven times which includes meditating on the meanings of the four letters of ārolik which are:

1. a: all dharmas are originally unborn (ādyanutpanna);
2. ra: all dharmas are dissociated from defilement (rajas);
3. la: characteristics (lakṣaṇa) are inapprehensible in all dharmas;
4. ka: all dharmas are without action (kārya).

The Ārolik mantra has also been found engraved on a few sculptures found in north India. One of these begins with "ārolik oṁ hrīḥ". Another one of these found in Bihar also included other mantras, including ye dharma hetu, followed by "namo ratnatrayāya namo Āryāvalokiteśvarāya bodhisatvāya mahāsatvāya mahākāruṇikāya Ārolok Oṁ hriḥ hriḥ".

Another longer mantra appears in a translation by Amoghavajra (T. 1033, 20: 9b1–7):

namoratnatrayāya | nama āryāvalokiteśvarāya bodhisattvāya mahāsattvāya mahākāruṇikāya | tadyathā padmapāṇi sara sara ehy ehi bhagavann āryāvalokiteśvara ārolik |

In Chinese, oṃ ārolik svāha is pronounced Ǎn ālǔlēi jì suōpóhē (唵 阿嚕勒繼 娑婆訶). In Korean, it is pronounced Om aroreuk Ge Sabaha (옴 아로늑계 사바하). In Japanese, it is pronounced On arori kya sowa ka (おん あろりきゃ そわか). In the Siddham script it is written as 𑖄𑖼 𑖁𑖨𑖺𑖩𑖰𑖎𑖿 𑖭𑖿𑖪𑖯𑖮𑖯𑗃.

=== Dharanis ===
The Kāraṇḍavyūha Sūtra also features the first appearance of the dhāraṇī of Cundī, which occurs at the end of the sūtra text. After the bodhisattva finally attains samādhi with the mantra "oṃ maṇipadme hūṃ", he is able to observe 77 koṭīs of fully enlightened buddhas replying to him in one voice with the Cundī Dhāraṇī: namaḥ saptānāṃ samyaksaṃbuddha koṭīnāṃ tadyathā, oṃ cale cule cunde svāhā.

The Nīlakaṇṭha Dhāraṇī is an 82-syllable dhāraṇī for Avalokiteśvara also known as the Great Compassion Mantra. It is very popular in East Asian Buddhism. Another popular Avalokiteśvara dharani in East Asian Buddhism is Eleven-Faced Avalokitesvara Heart Dharani. This dharani is associated with Avalokiteśvara's eleven face form, known as Ekādaśamukha, one of the six forms of Guanyin.

=== East Asian chants and phrases ===
In East Asian Buddhism, the most popular form of Avalokiteśvara is the feminine white robed Guanyin. A common phrase which is widely chanted and recited by East Asian Buddhists is:

Chinese	南無觀世音菩薩
Mandarin pronunciation (Pinyin)	Námó Guānshìyīn Púsà
Cantonese pronunciation (Jyutping)	Naam4 Mou4 Gun1 Sai3 Jam1 Pou4 Saat3
Japanese pronunciation (Romaji)	Namu Kanzeon Butsu
Korean pronunciation (Revised Romanization)	Namu Gwanseeum Bosal
English meaning	Homage to Avalokitesvara Bodhisattva (南無 being borrowed from Sanskrit नमो namo)

There are also longer chants, usually termed "White Robe Avalokitesvara" (Baiyin Guanyin) sutras (jing) or mantras (zhou). The most well known is the "Divine White-robed Avalokiteśvara Mantra" (c. 11th century). This longer mantra is as follows:

Chinese Characters	Mandarin Pinyin	Cantonese Jyutping	Translation
南無 大慈 大悲 救苦 救難 廣大 靈感 觀世音 菩薩	Námó dàcí dàbēi jiùkǔ jiùnàn guǎngdà línggǎn Guānshìyīn púsà	Naam4 mou4 daai6 ci4 daai6 bei1 gau3 fu2 gau3 naan4 gwong2 daai6 ling4 gam2 gun1 sai3 jam1 pou4 saat3	Homage to Guanyin Bodhisattva [who is] loving, compassionate and powerful, delivering sentient beings from unhappiness and hardship.
南無 佛，南無 法，南無 僧	Námó Fó, Námó Fǎ, Námó Sēng	Naam4 mou4 fat6 naam4 mou4 faat3 naam4 mou4 zang1	Homage to the Buddha, Homage to the Dharma, Homage to the Sangha
南無 救苦 救難 觀世音 菩薩	Námó jiùkǔ jiùnàn Guānshìyīn púsà	Naam4 mou4 gau3 fu2 gau3 naan4 gun1 sai3 jam1 pou4 saat3	Homage to Guanyin Bodhisattva who delivers sentient beings from unhappiness and hardship
怛垤哆唵, 伽囉伐哆, 伽囉伐哆, 伽訶佛哆, 囉伽佛哆, 囉伽佛哆, 娑婆訶	DA ZHI DUO ONG, QIE LA FA DUO, QIE LA FA DUO, QIE HE FA DUO, LA QIE FA DUO, LA QIE FA DUO, SA PO HE	Daat3 dit6 do1 am2 gaa1 lo1 fat6 do1 gaa1 lo1 fat6 do1 gaa1 ho1 fat6 do1 lo1 gaa1 fat6 do1 lo1 gaa1 fat6 do1 so1 po4 ho1	(Sanskrit Mantra: Tadyatha Om, khara varta, khara varta, gaha varta, raga varta, raga varta, Svaha)
天羅神, 地羅神, 人離難, 難離身, 一切 災殃 化 為塵	Tiān luó shén, Dì luó shén, Rén lí nán, Nán lí shēn, Yīqiè zāiyāng huà wéichén	Tin1 lo4 san4 dei6 lo4 san4 jan4 lei4 naan4 naan4 lei4 san1 jat1 cai3 zoi1 joeng1 faa3 wai4 can4	Heavenly deities and earthly deities, may people be free from difficulties, may their hardships disappear, may all disasters and calamities turn to dust
南無 摩訶 般若波羅蜜	Námó Móhē Bōrěbōluómi	Naam4 mou4 mo1 ho1 bun1 joek6 bo1 lo4 mat6	Homage to Mahāprajñāpāramitā

Another popular dharani of Guanyin is associated with her power over children and childbirth. This is called the "Dharani Sutra of White-Robed Guanyin's Heart of Five Seals".

In Japanese Buddhism, a popular longer chant to Kannon or Kanzeon (Guanyin) is the jikku kan'on gyō (十句觀音經), the "10 Verse Kannon Sutra". It is the following:

Japanese Kanji	Japanese Romaji	Translation
觀世音	kan ze on	Kanzeon
南無佛	na mu butsu	Homage to Buddha
與佛有因	yo butsu u in	forged a causal connection with Buddha,
與佛有縁	yo butsu u en	a karmic affinity with Buddha,
佛法僧縁	butsu ho so en	a karmic affinity with Buddha, Dharma, Sangha
常樂我淨	jo raku ga jo	thus attaining permanence, ease, selfhood, and purity.
朝念觀世音	cho nen kan ze on	In the morning think of Kanzeon,
暮念觀世音	bo nen kan ze on	in the evening think of Kanzeon.
念念從心起	nen nen ju shin ki	Thought after thought arises from mind;
念念不離心	nen nen fu ri shin	thought after thought is not separate from mind.

== Tibetan Buddhist beliefs ==
Avalokiteśvara is an important deity in Tibetan Buddhism. He is regarded in the Vajrayana teachings as a Buddha.

In Tibetan Buddhism, Tãrã came into existence from a single tear shed by Avalokiteśvara. When the tear fell to the ground it created a lake, and a lotus opening in the lake revealed Tara. In another version of this story, Tara emerges from the heart of Avalokiteśvara. In either version, it is Avalokiteśvara's outpouring of compassion which manifests Tãrã as a being.

Certain living tulku lineages, including the Dalai Lamas and the Karmapas, are considered by many Tibetan Buddhists to also be manifestations of Avalokiteśvara.

== Iconography ==
=== Deer-skin (tinasara) ===
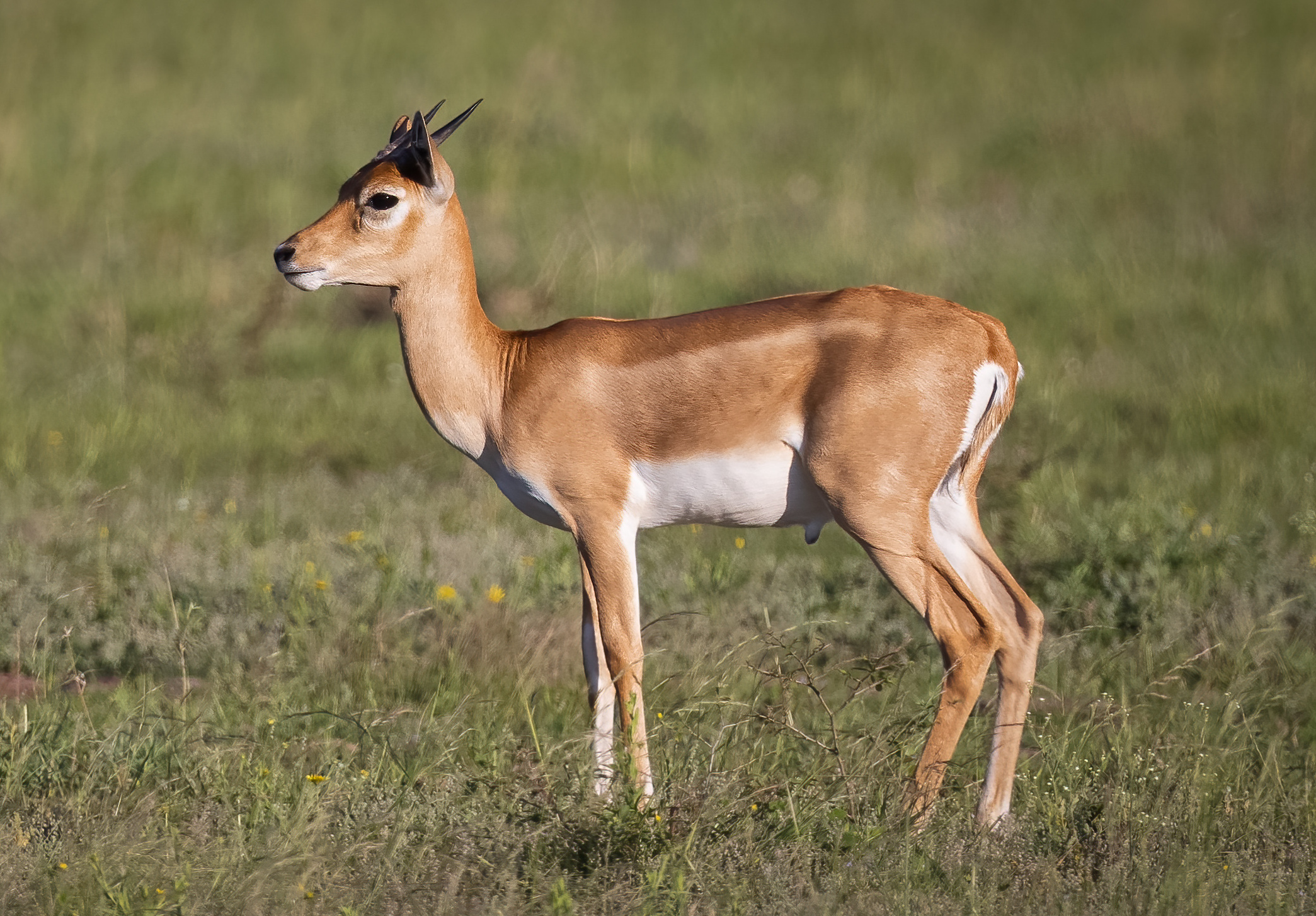
krishnasara deer (Antilope cervicapra)

In Tibetan iconography, Avalokiteśvara (Chenrezig) is occasionally depicted wearing a deer-skin—tinasara or krishnasara कृष्णसार (kṛṣṇasāra) in Sanskrit, and ཀྲཱིཤྣ་སཱ་ར (krī-shna-sā-ra) or ཁྲི་སྙན་སཱ་ར། in Tibetan—draped over his left shoulder. This attribute serves as a layered symbol of renunciation, deep compassion, and yogic practice. Historically, Indian ascetics used deer-skins as meditation seats or garments to support austere retreat and concentration.

The iconographic tradition may trace back to the Ruru Jātaka (Jātaka tale No. 482), also known as the 'Golden Deer' story, in which the bodhisattva was once born as a splendid golden deer endowed with compassion and the ability to speak human languages. He saved a man from drowning and, when the king later hunted him, he offered himself to protect his followers. His act of selflessness moved the king to prohibit hunting throughout the realm—thus embodying compassion that transforms society.

This convergence of yogic renunciation, mythic compassion, and visual representation makes the tinasara a powerful emblem in Chenrezig's devotional art.

== Gallery ==
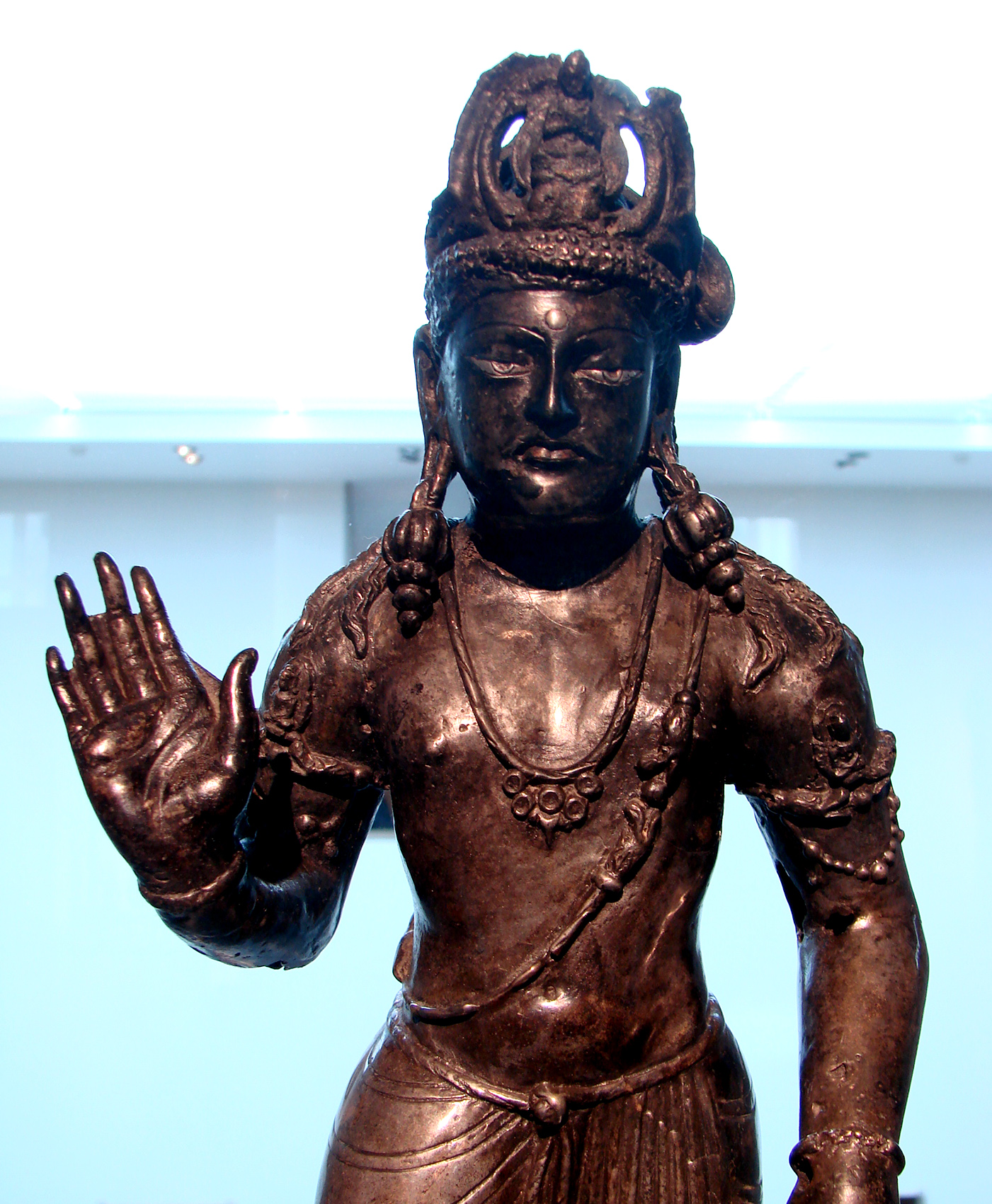
Gandhāran statue of Avalokiteśvara, abhaya-mudrā. 3rd century CE.

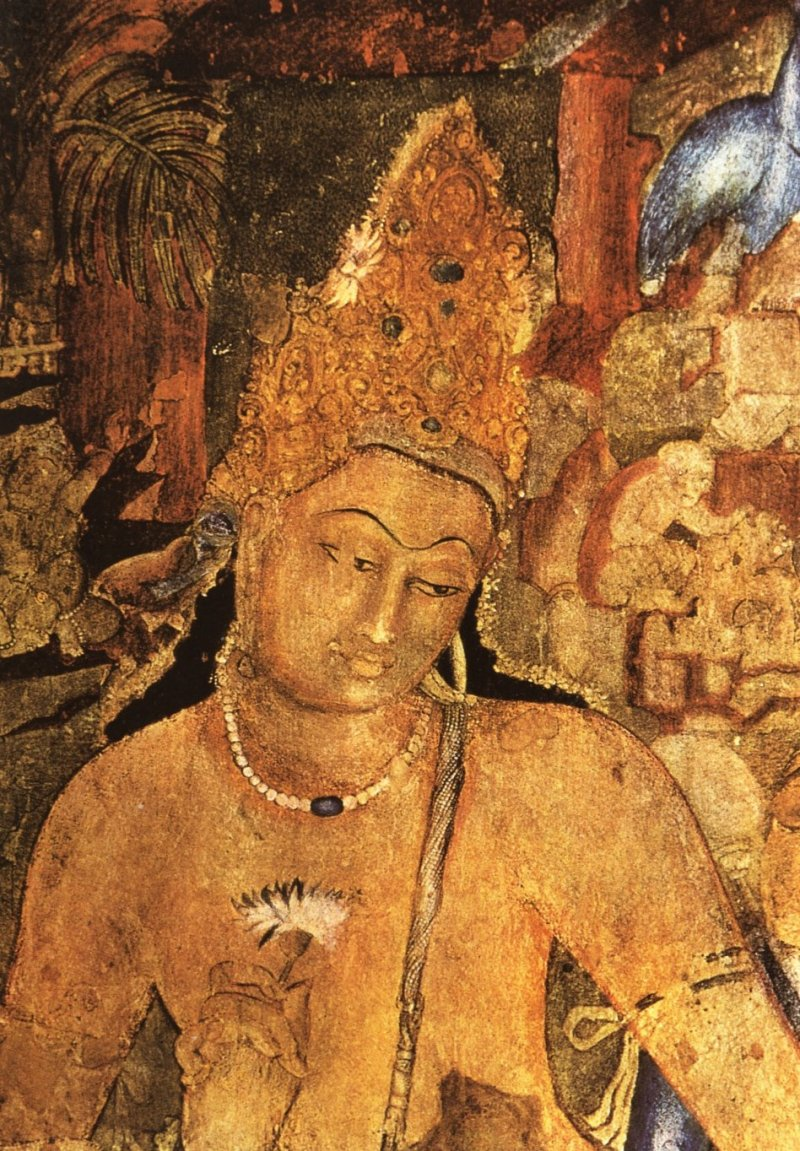
Indian cave wall painting of Avalokiteśvara. Ajaṇṭā Caves, 6th century CE.

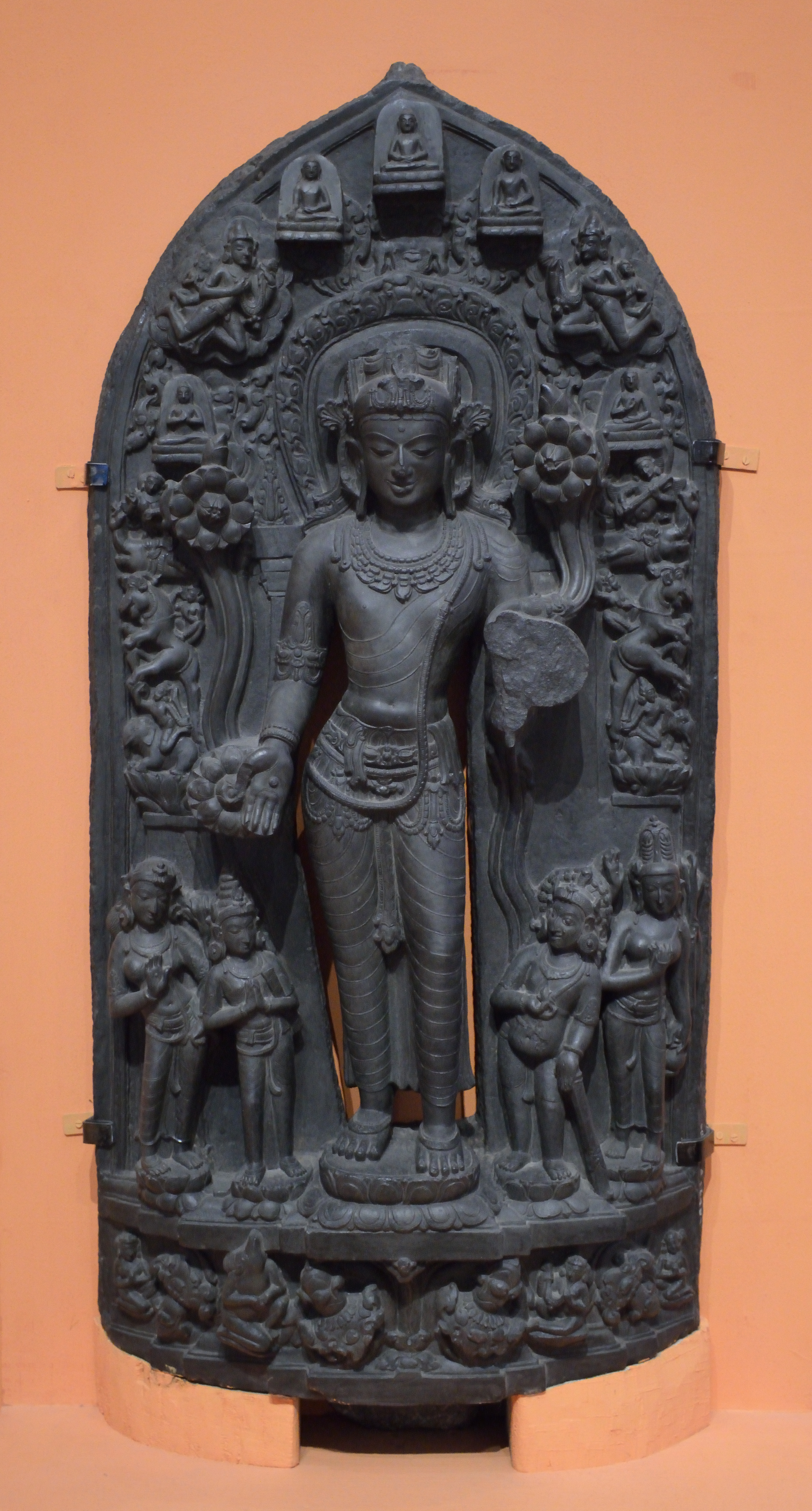
Avalokitesvara, c. 11th–12th century CE, Pala Period

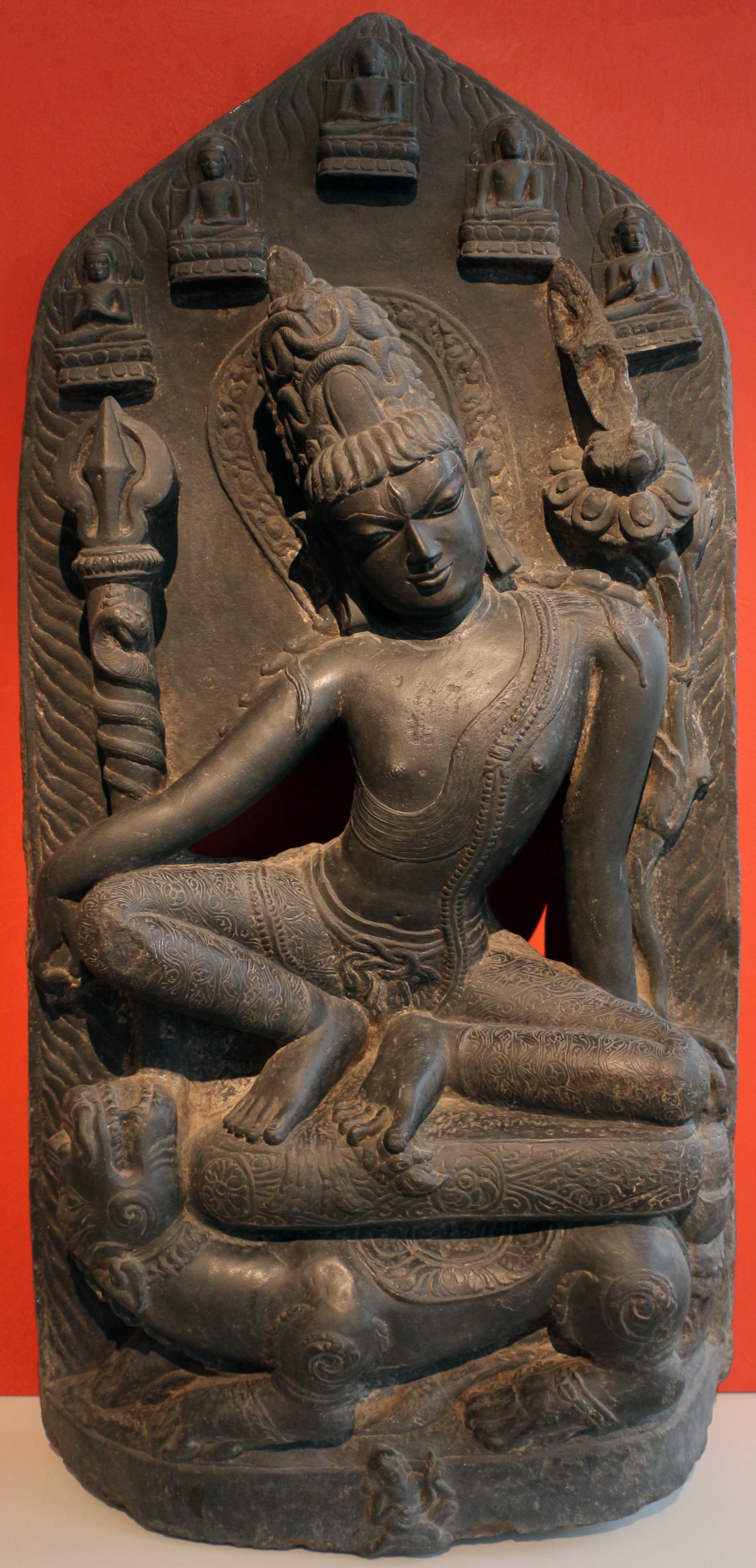
Avalokitesvara, Pala period

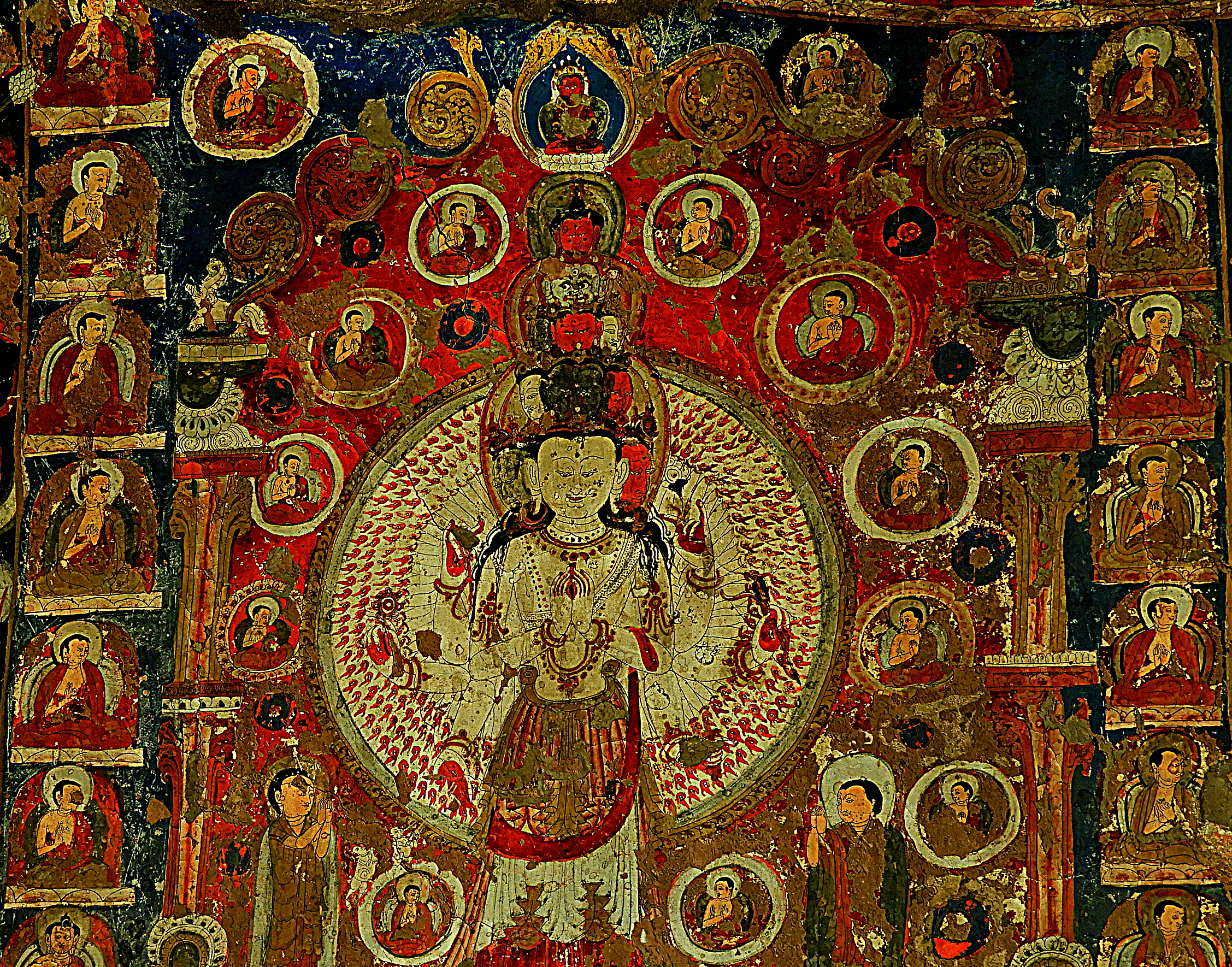
1000-armed Avalokiteśvara dated 13th–15th century CE at Saspol cave (Gon-Nila-Phuk Cave Temples and Fort) in Ladakh, India

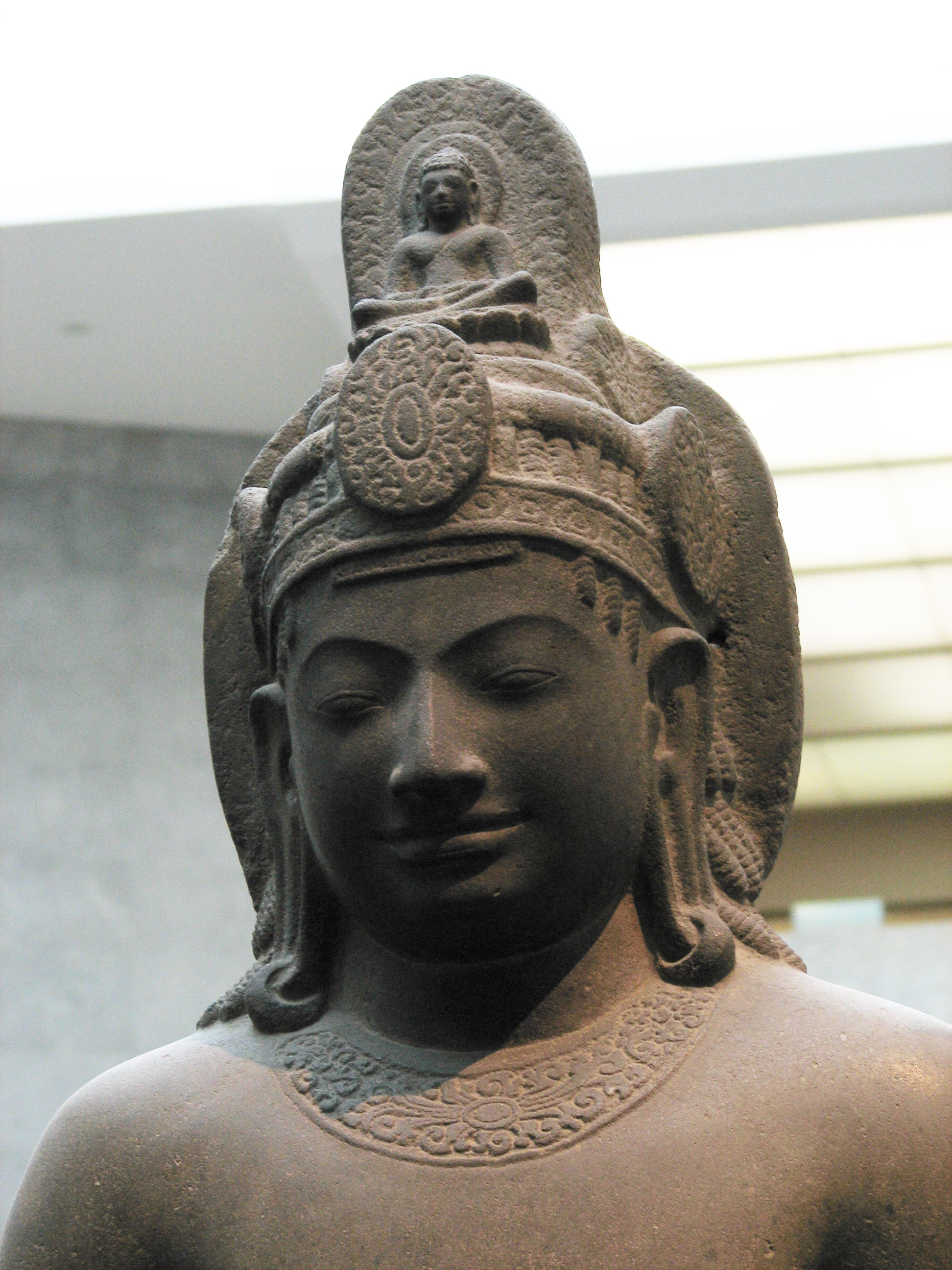
Cambodian statue of Avalokiteśvara. Sandstone, 7th century CE.

Avalokiteśvara sandstone statue, late 7th century CE

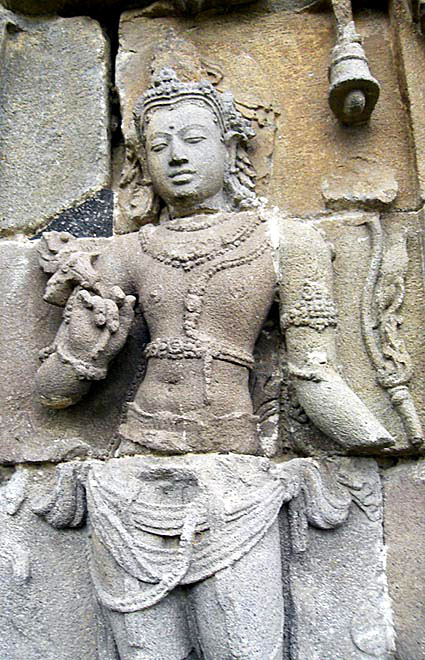
Padmapani holding a lotus. 8th–9th century Sailendran art, Plaosan temple, Java, Indonesia.

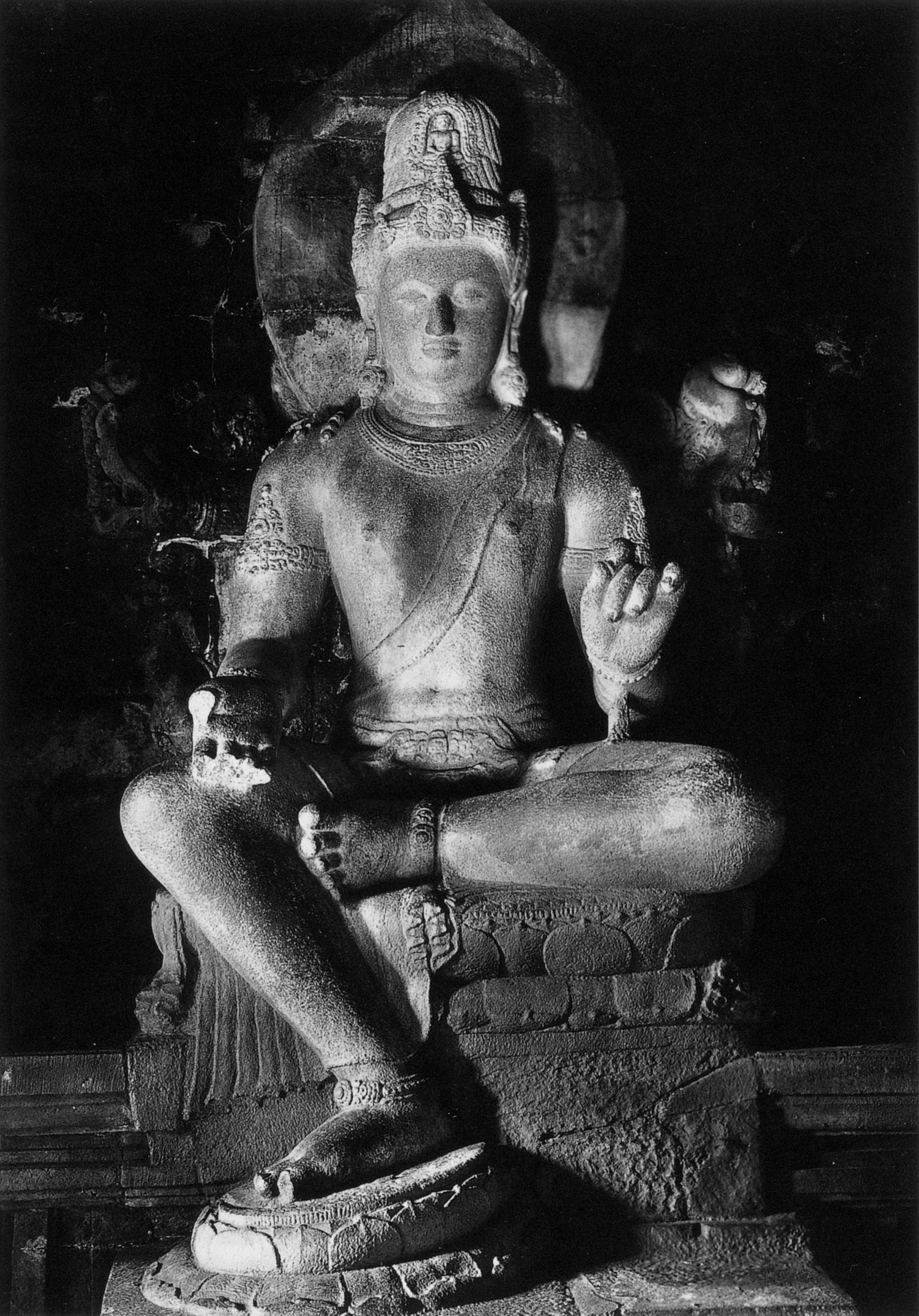
Avalokiteśvara andesite stone in Mendut temple, early 9th century Sailendran art, Java, Indonesia

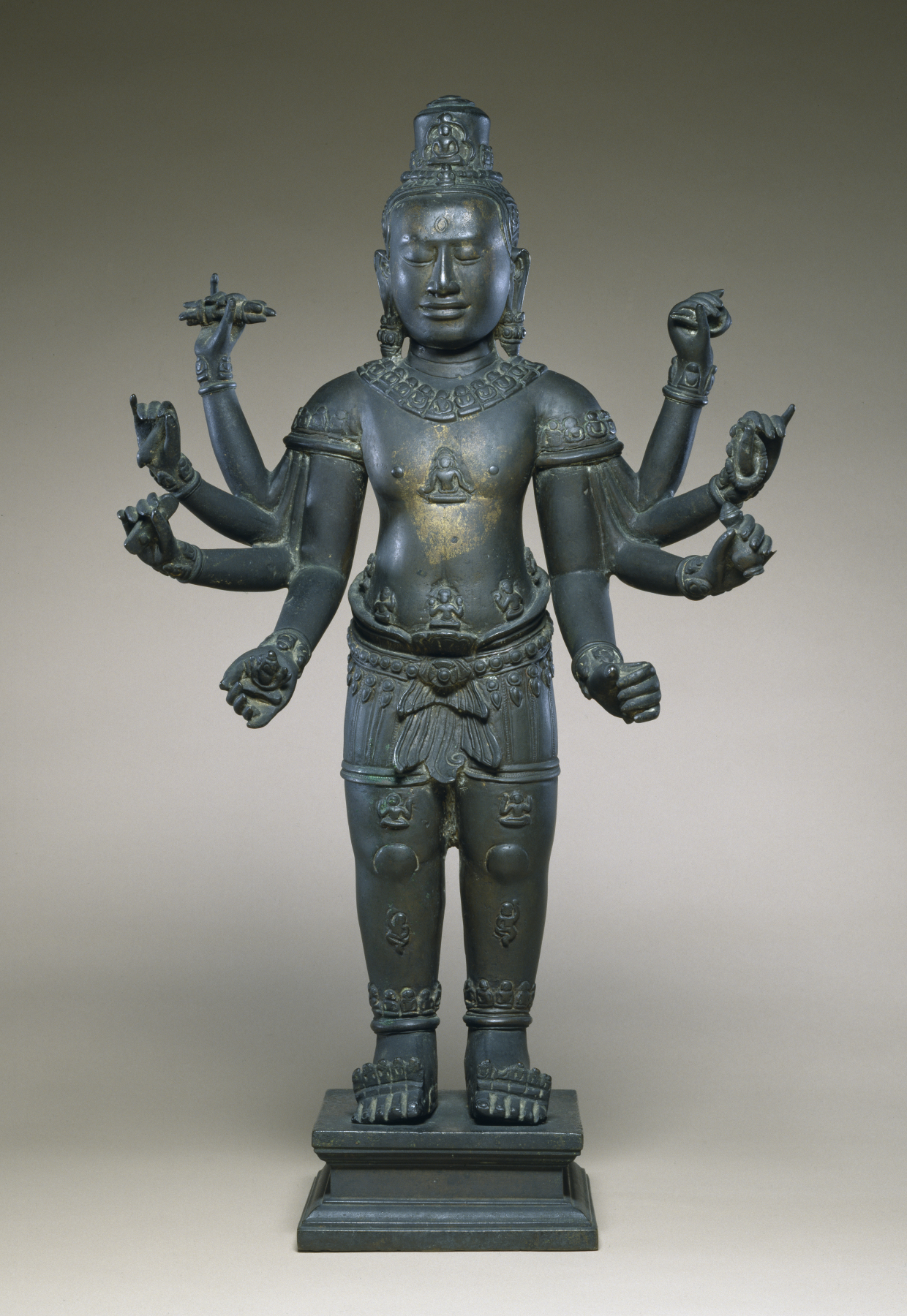
Eight-armed Avalokiteśvara, Khmer art ca. 12th–13th century (Bàyon). The Walters Art Museum.

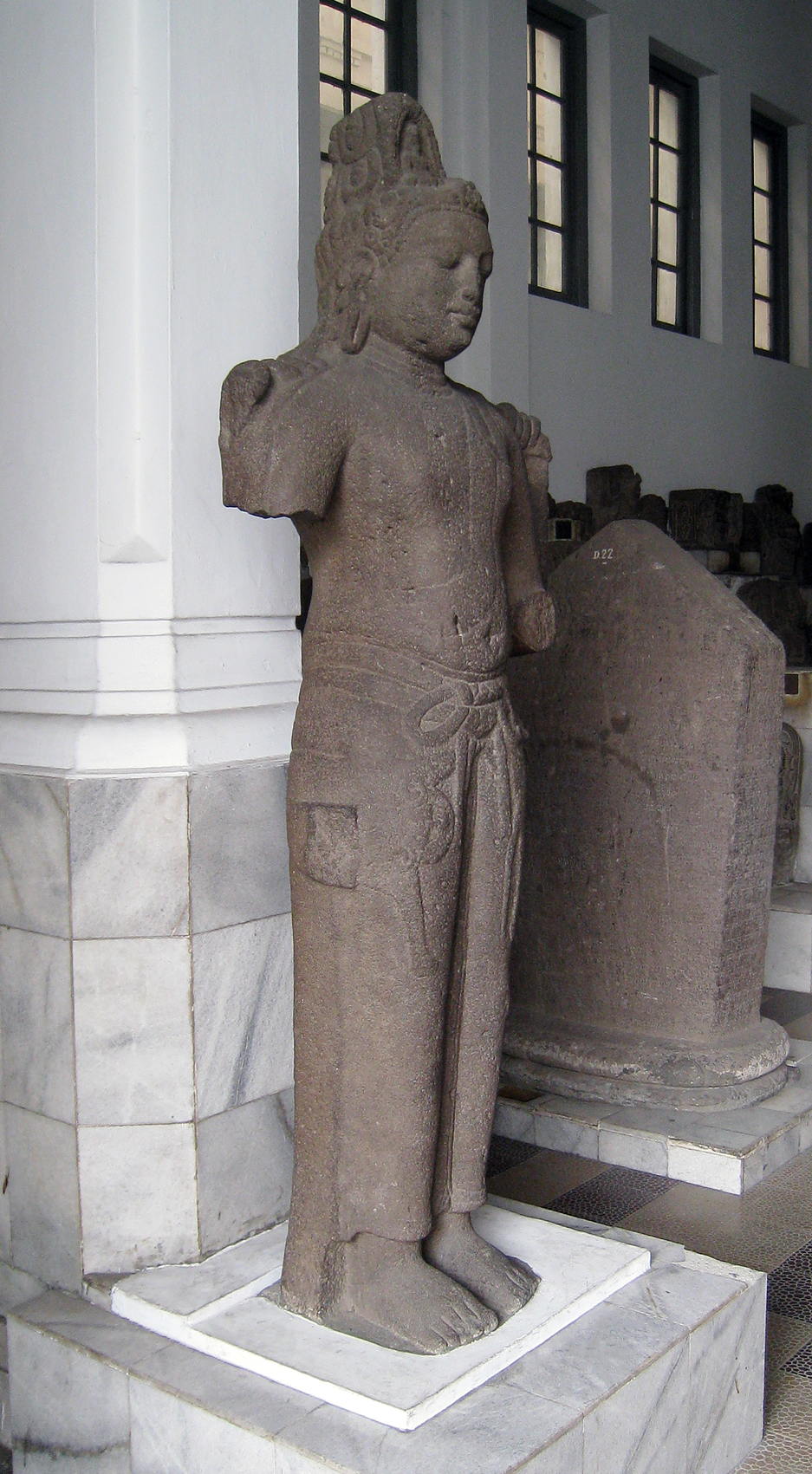
Avalokiteśvara from Bingin Jungut, Musi Rawas, South Sumatra. Srivijayan art (c. 8th–9th century CE)

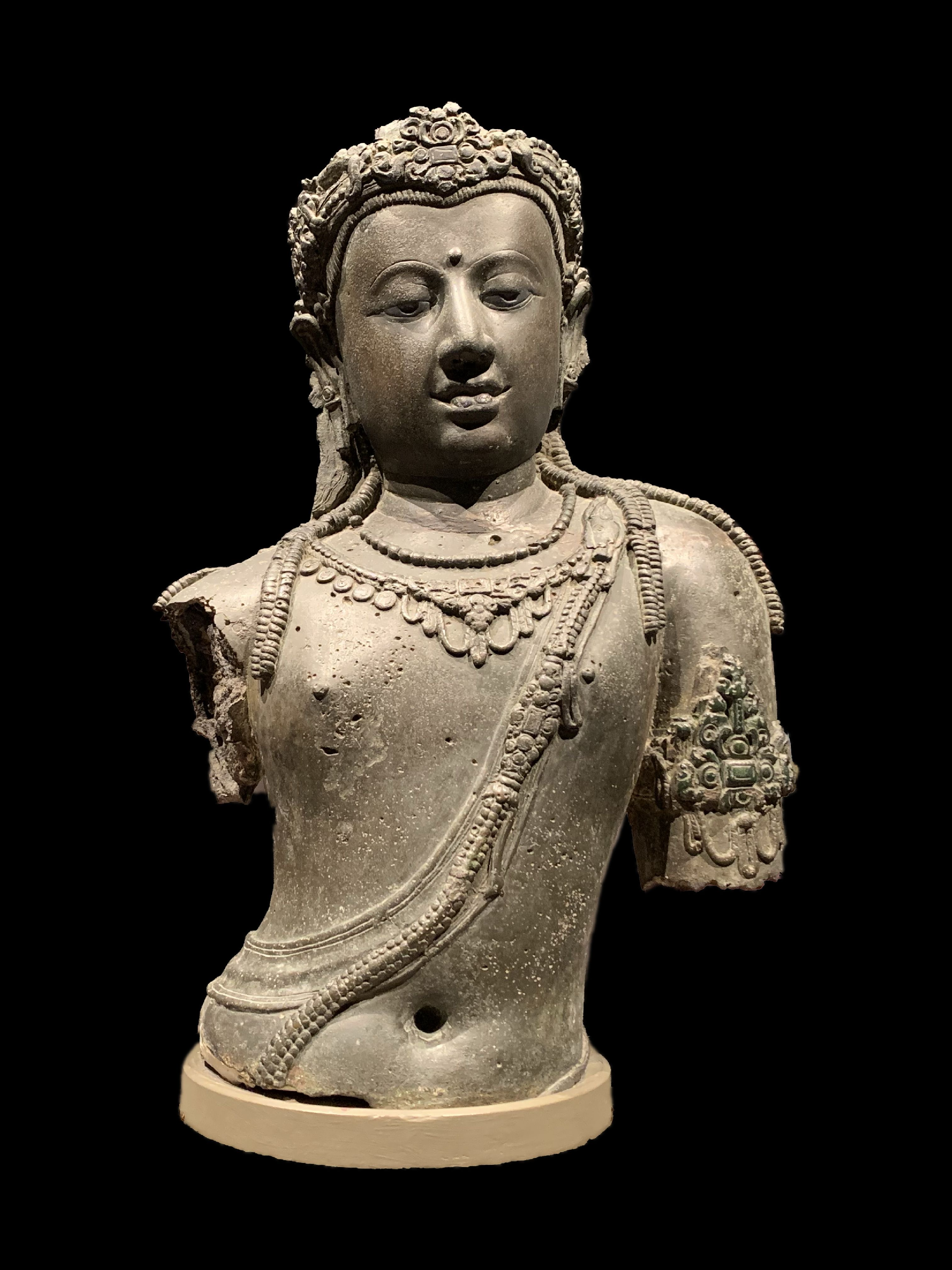
The bronze torso Avalokiteshvara of Chaiya, 8th century CE Srivijayan art, Chaiya District, Surat Thani Province, Southern Thailand

The Privy Seal of King Ananda Mahidol of Thailand show a picture of a Bodhisattva, based on a Srivijayan sculpture of Avalokiteśvara Padmapani which was found at Chaiya District, Surat Thani Province.

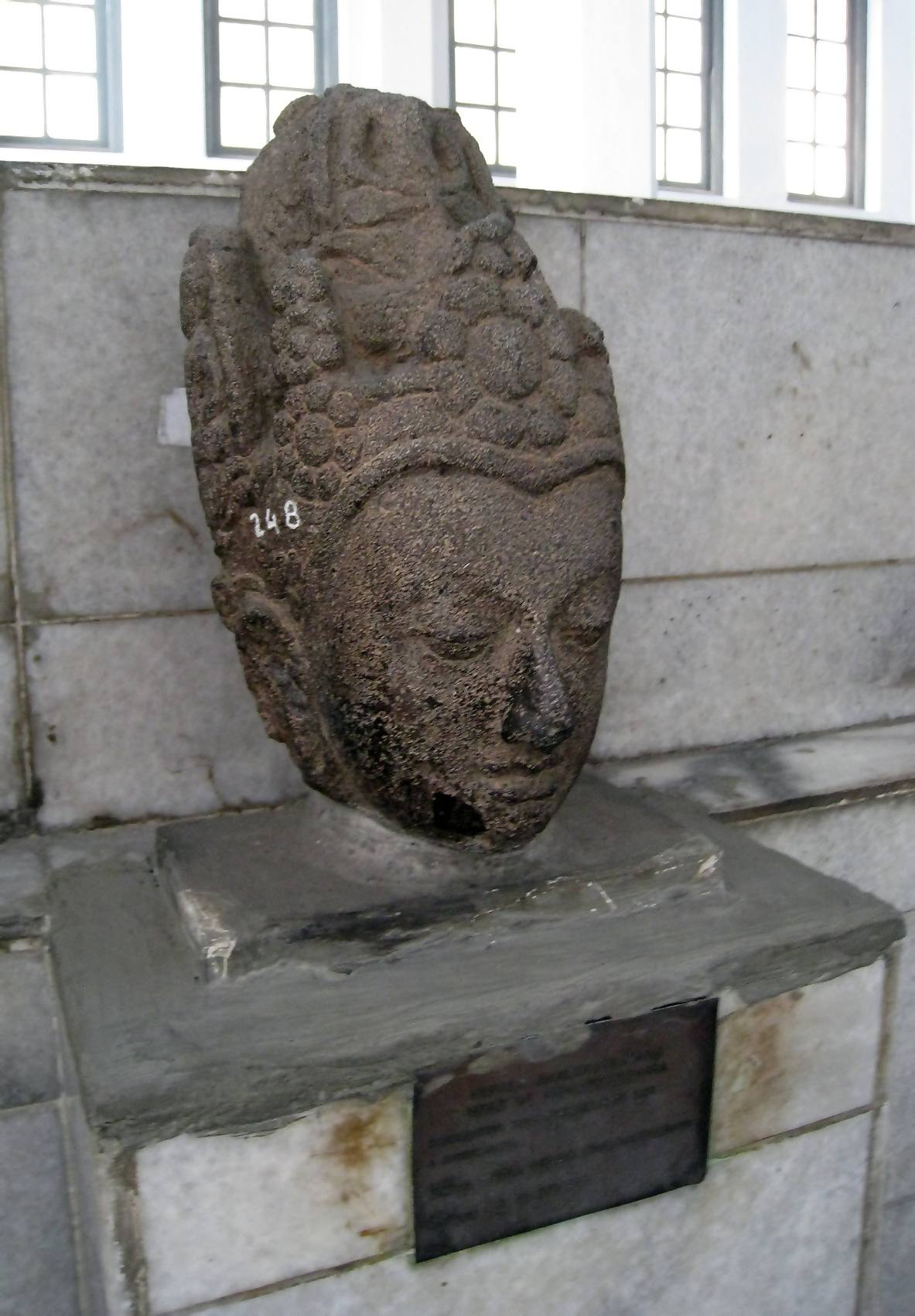
The stone head of Avalokiteśvara, discovered in Aceh. Srivijaya, estimated 9th century.

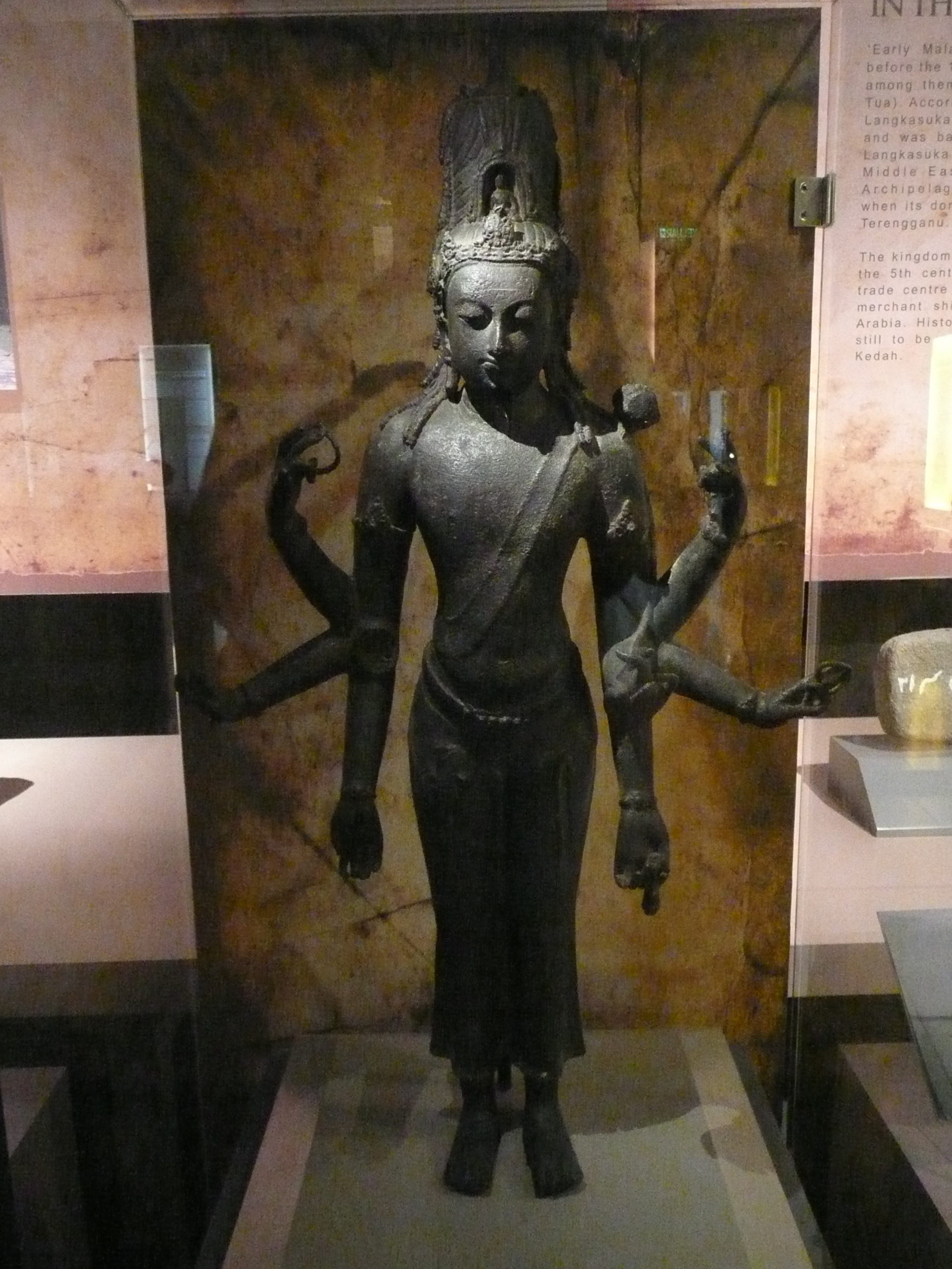
Malaysian statue of Avalokiteśvara. Bidor, 8th–9th century CE.

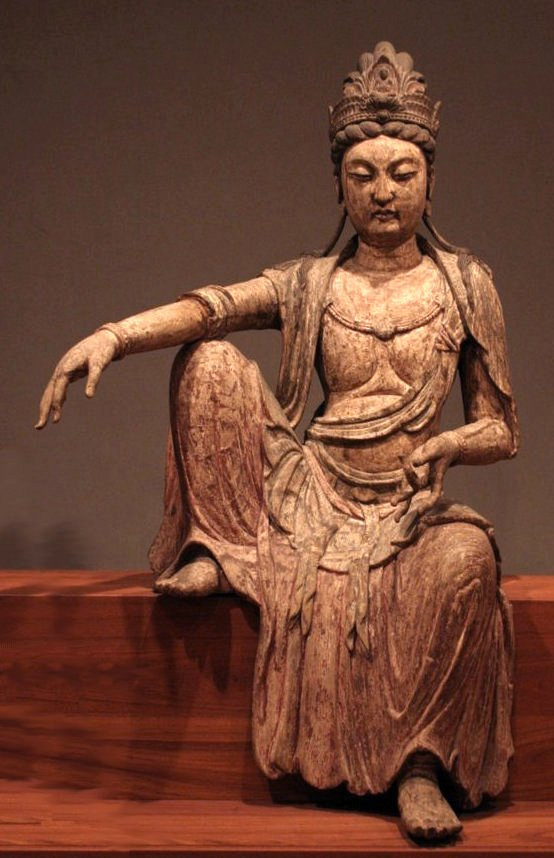
Chinese statue of Avalokiteśvara looking out over the sea, c. 1025 CE

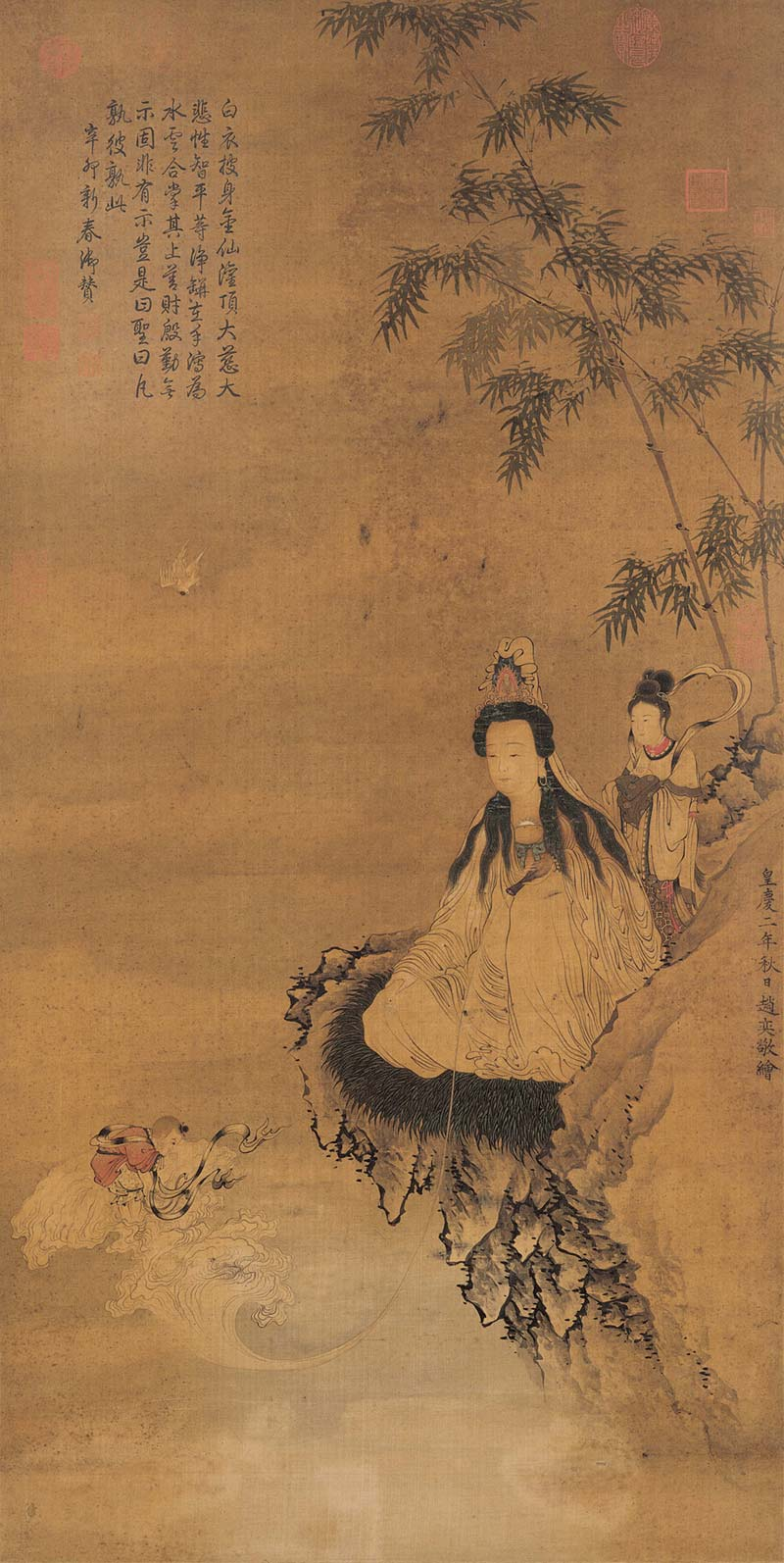
Chinese hanging scroll depicting Shancai, Avalokiteśvara and Longnü, Yuan Dynasty

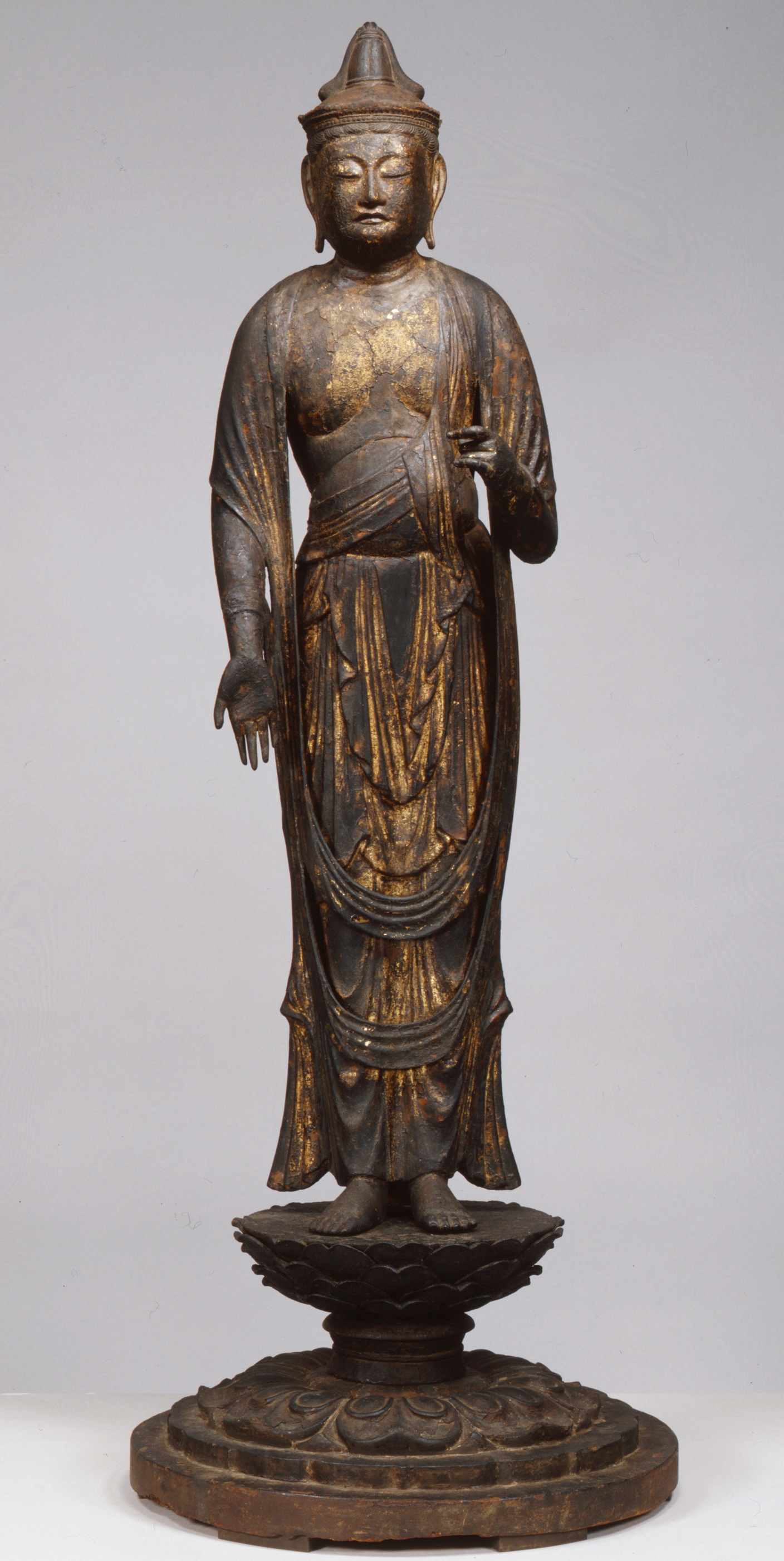
Standing Kannon Bosatsu (Avalokitesvara), 12th century, Heian period, Tokyo National Museum, Japan

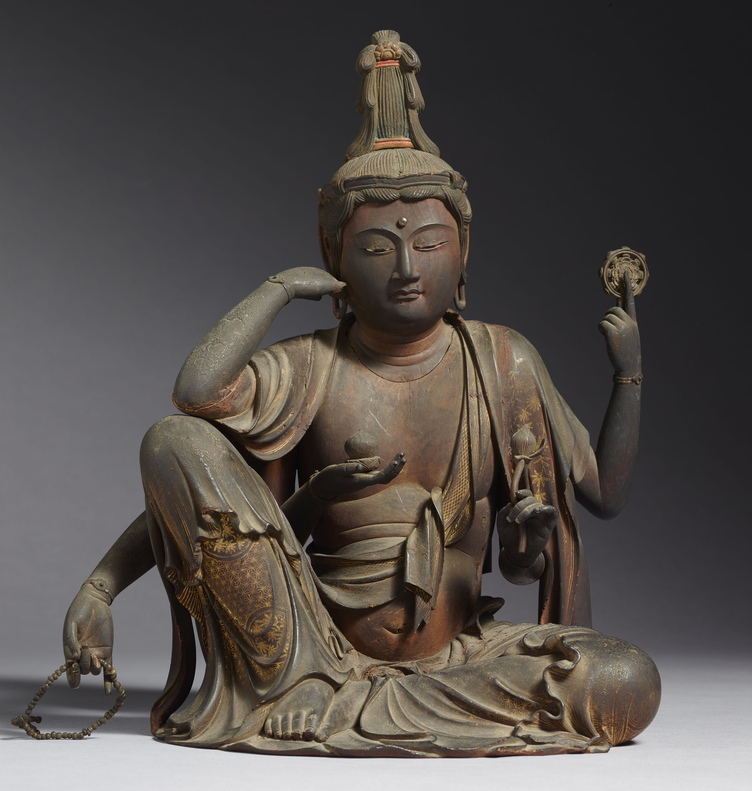
Nyoirin Kannon, 1275, Tokyo National Museum, Japan.

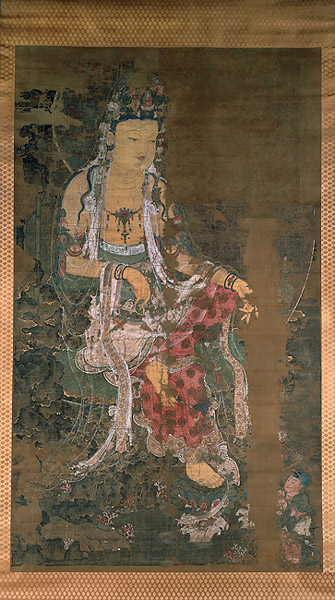
Korean painting of Avalokiteśvara. Kagami Jinjya, Japan, 1310 CE.

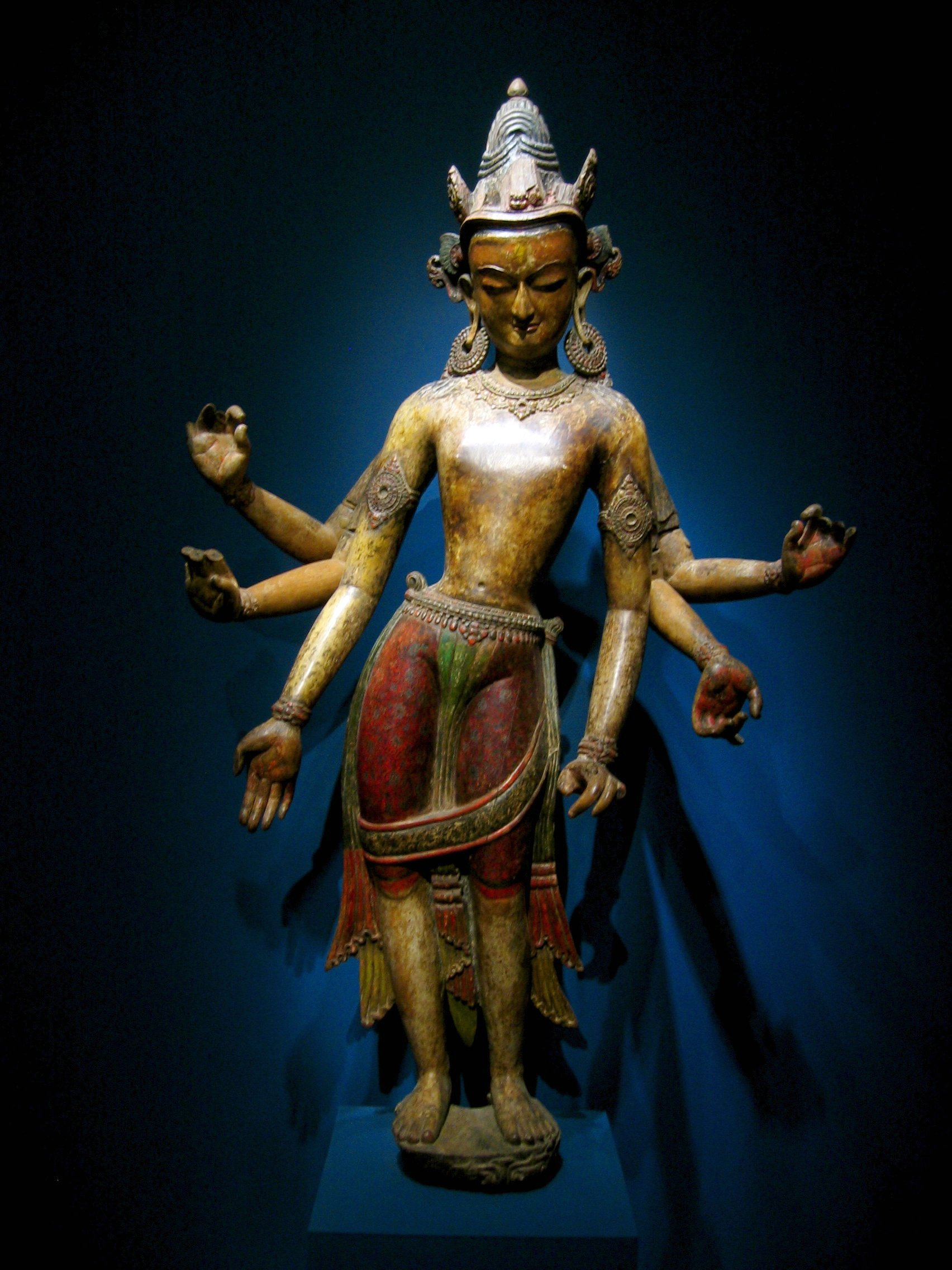
Nepalese statue of Avalokiteśvara with six arms. 14th century CE.

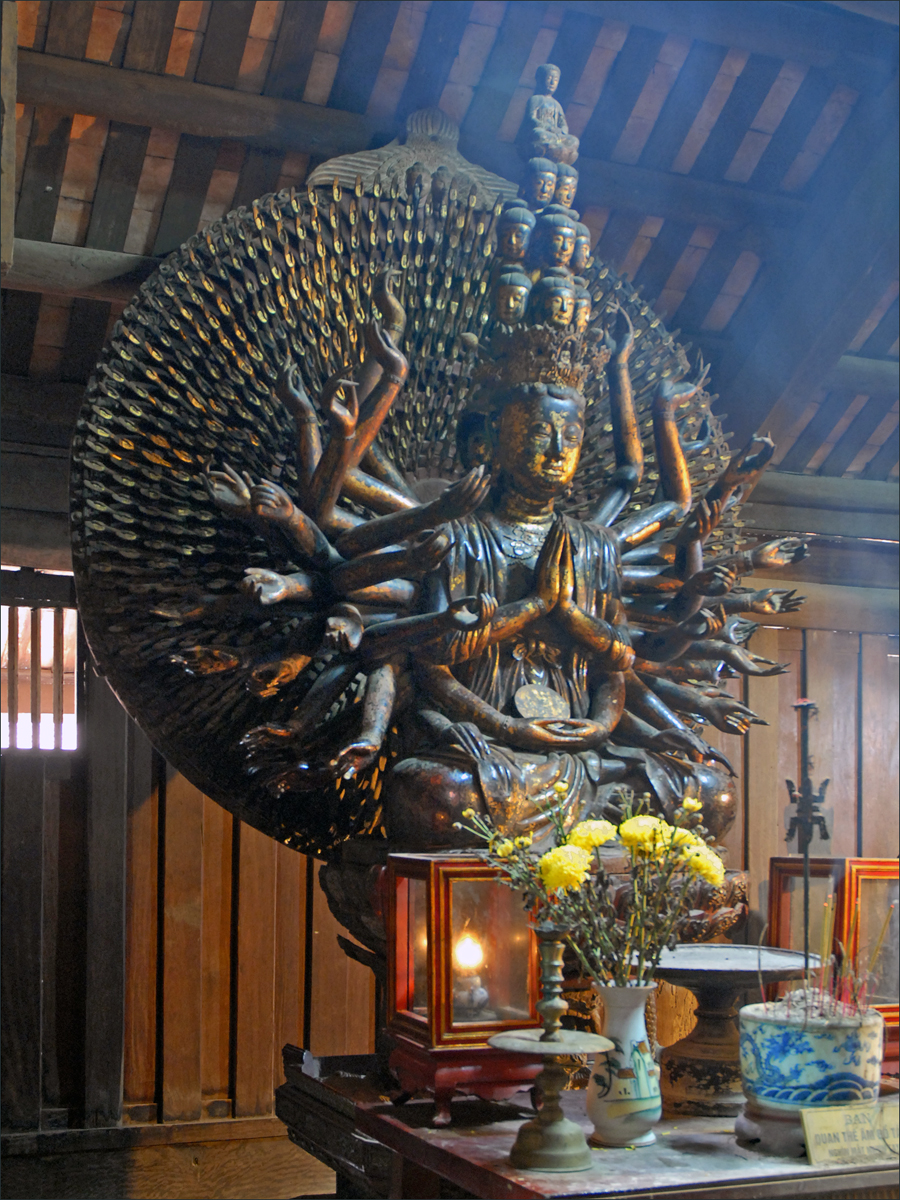
Avalokiteśvara of One Thousand Arms, lacquered and gilded wood. Restored in 1656 CE. Bút Tháp Temple, Bắc Ninh Province, Vietnam.

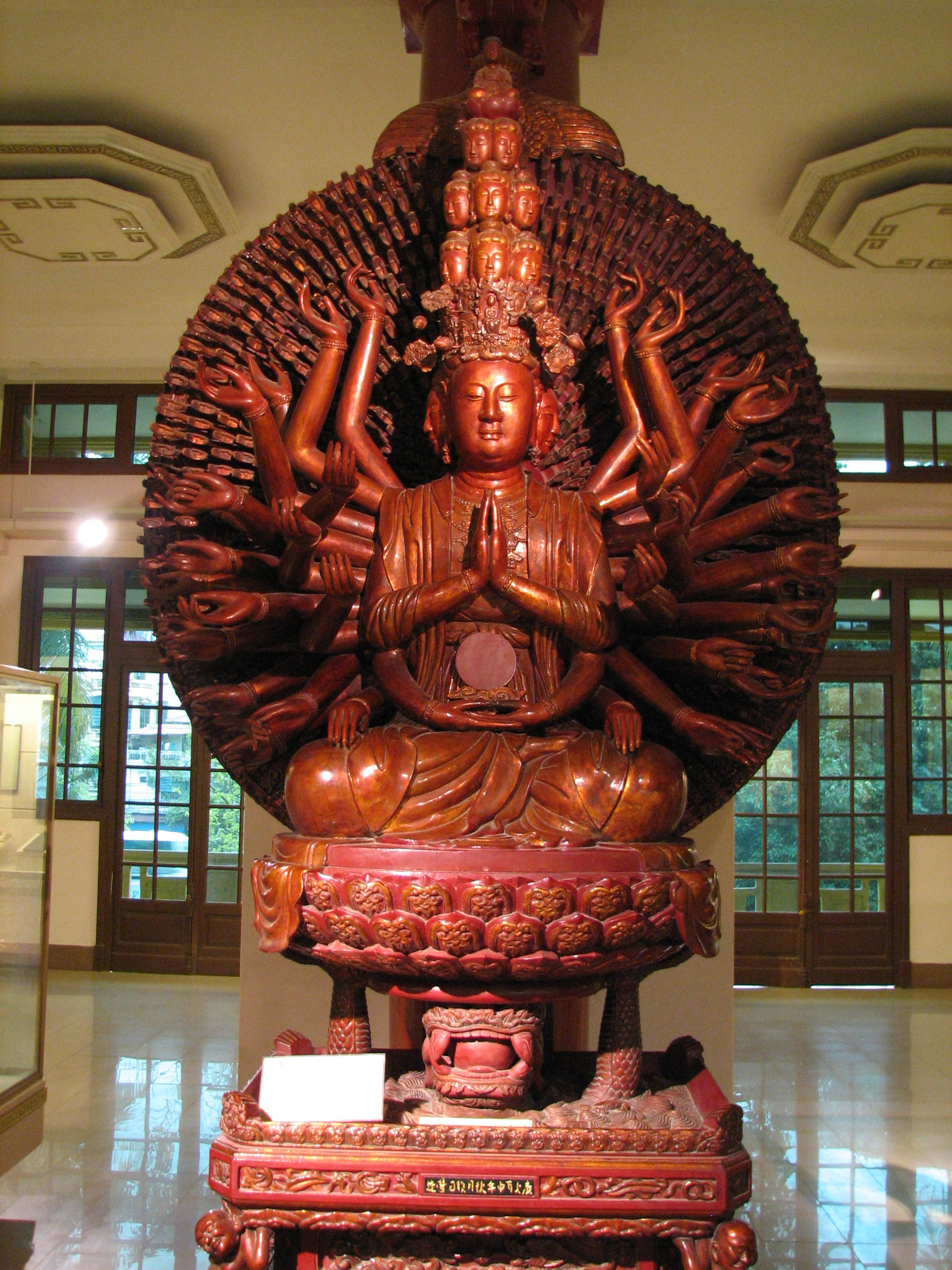
This wooden statue of Quan Âm Nghìn Mắt Nghìn Tay (Quan Âm Bodhisattva with 1000 eyes and 1000 hands) was fashioned in 1656 in Bắc Ninh Province, northern Vietnam. It is now located in the History Museum in Hanoi.

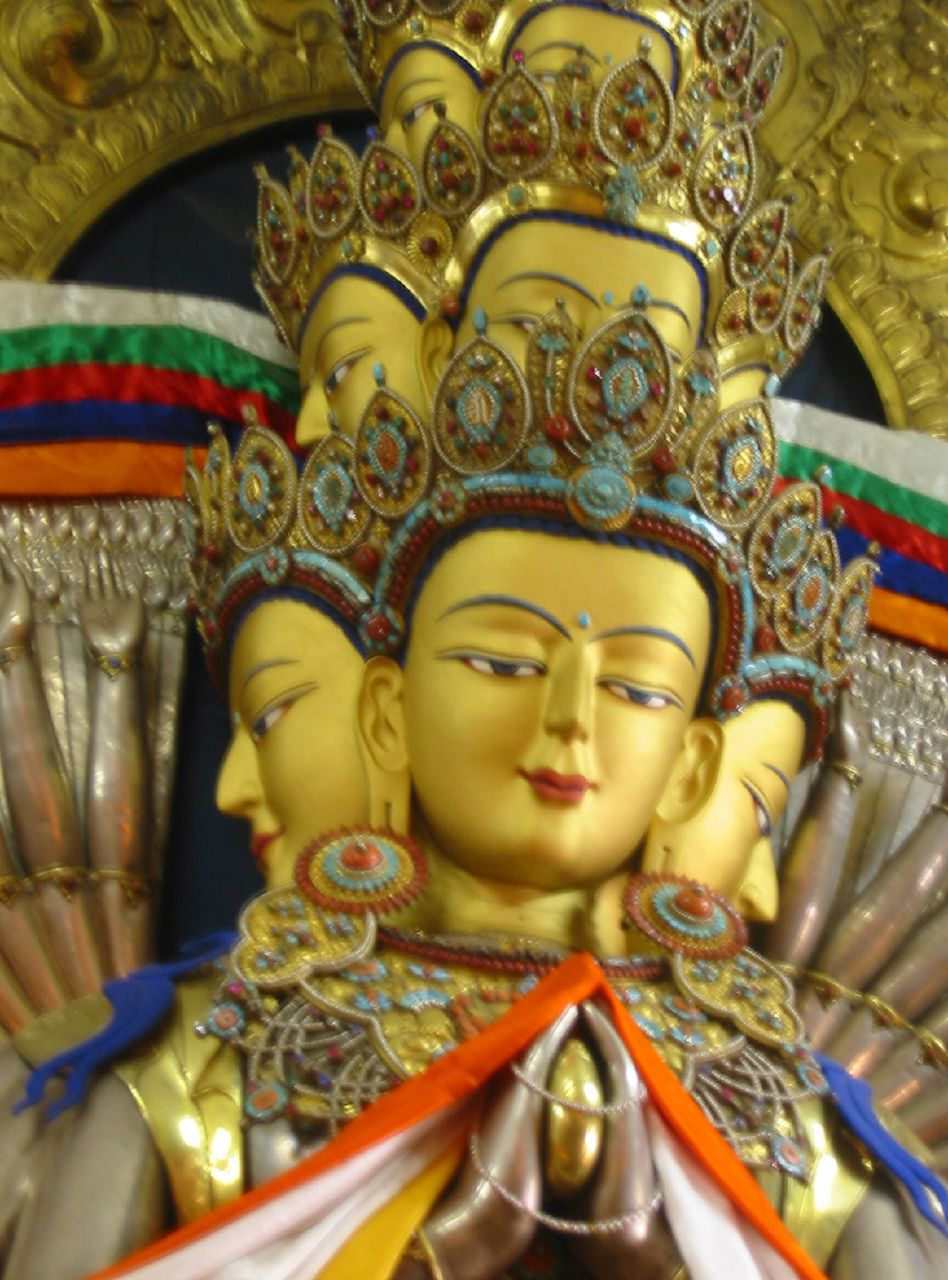
Tibetan statue of Avalokiteśvara with eleven faces

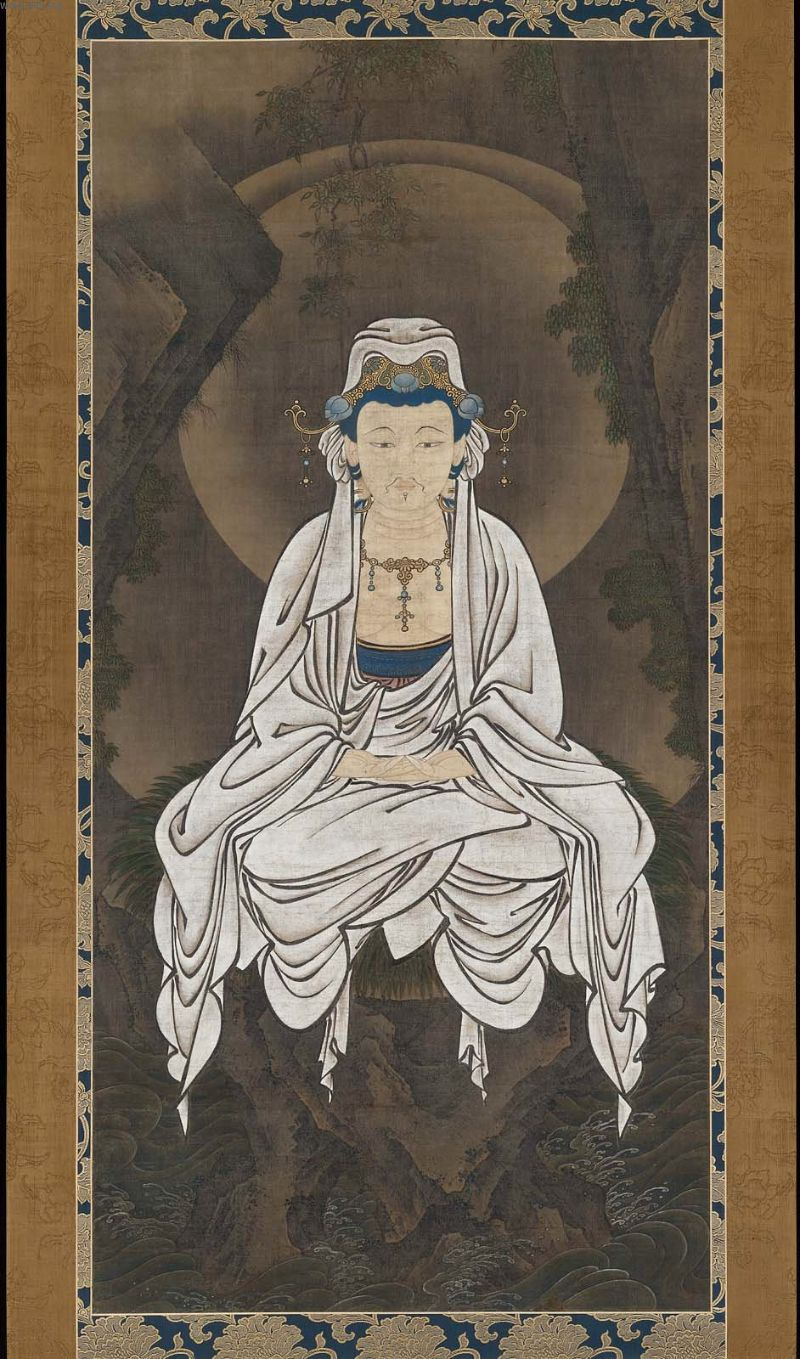
Japanese painting of Avalokiteśvara meditating. 16th century CE.

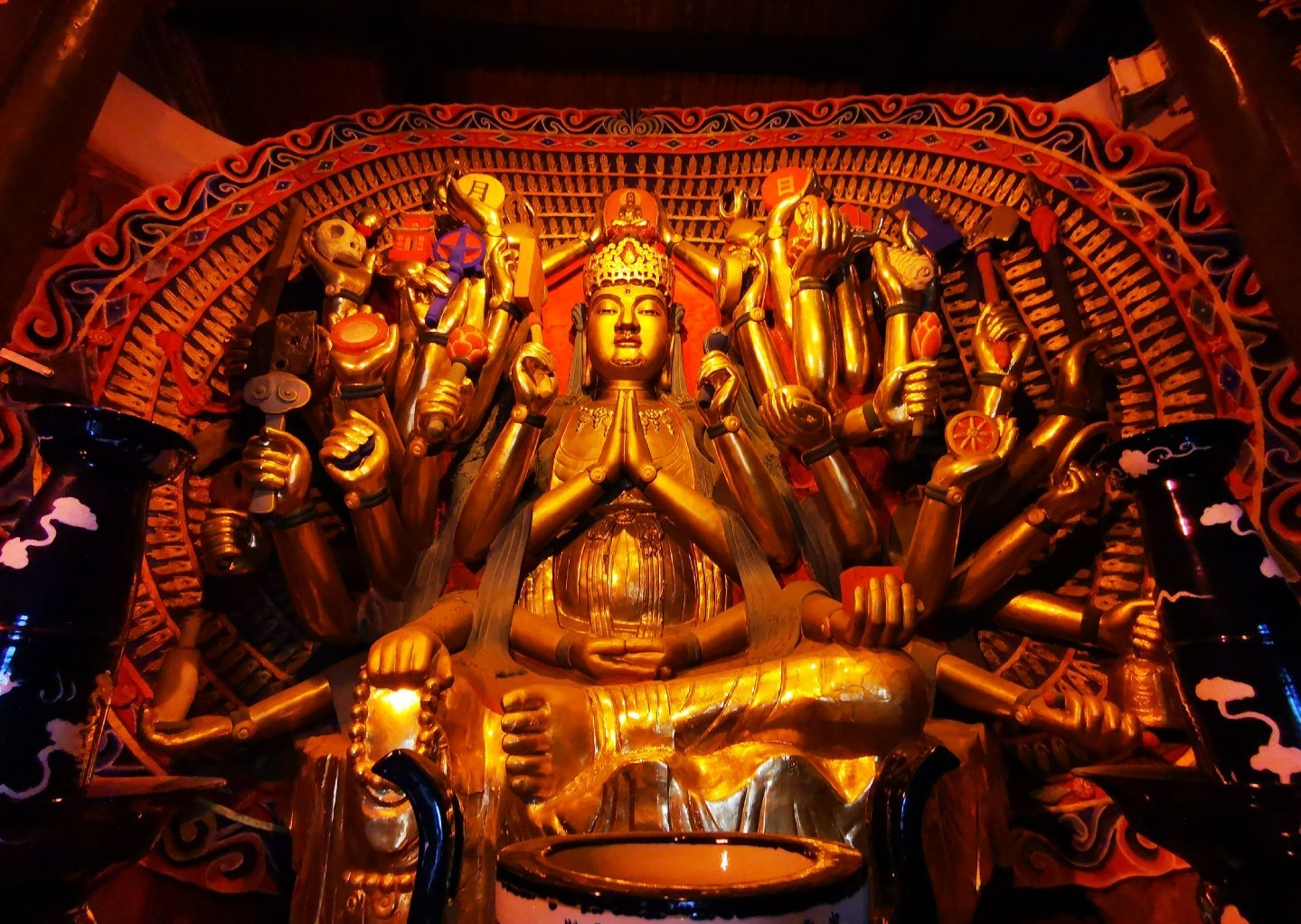
Tang dynasty (896 CE) carved stone statue of Qianshou Guanyin in Shengshui Temple (內江聖水寺) in Neijiang, Sichuan, China

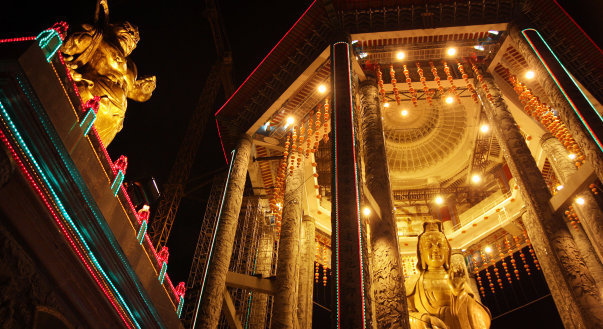
The world tallest octagonal pavilion to shelter the Guanyin statue in Kek Lok Si in Air Itam, Penang, Malaysia

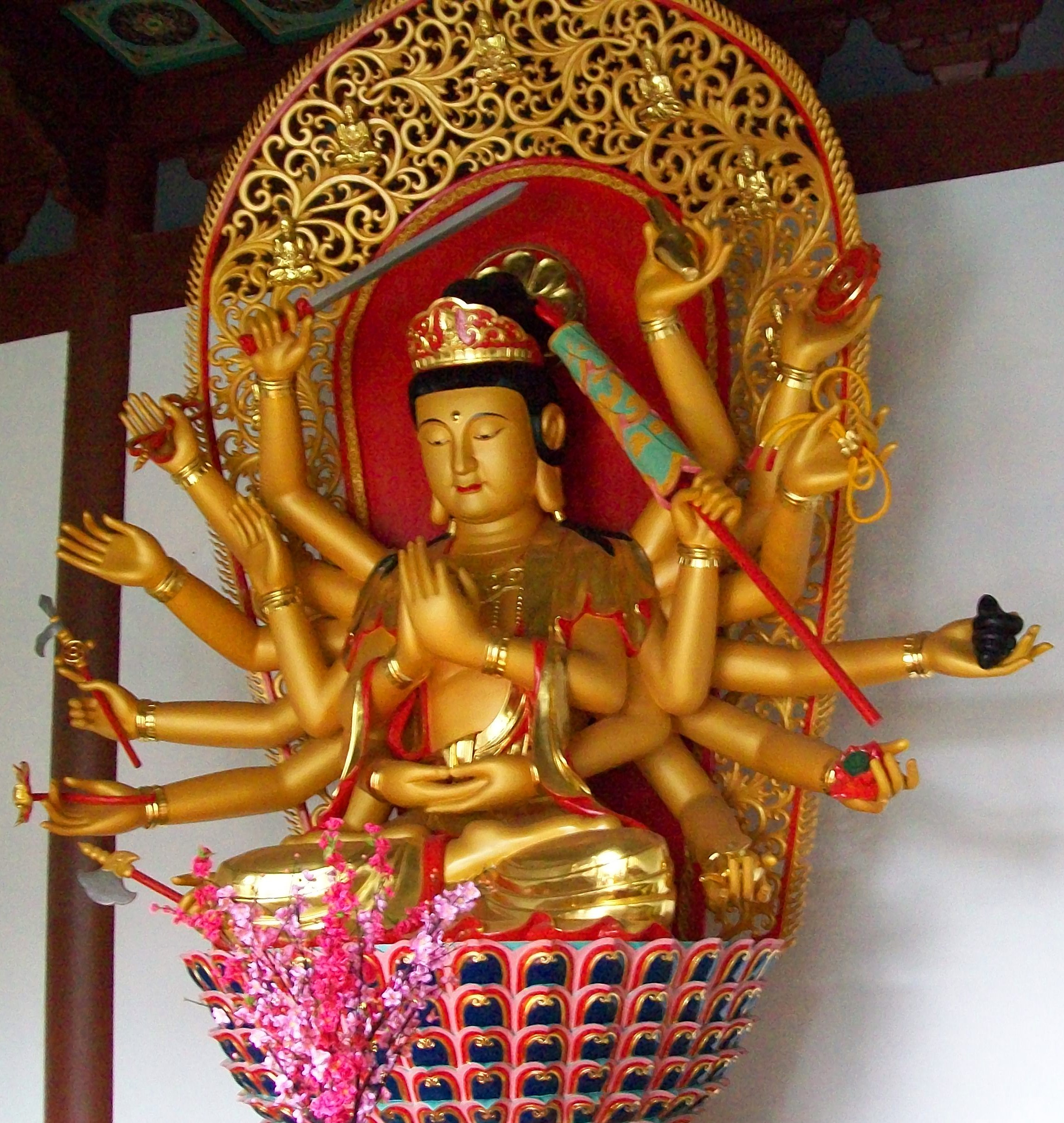
Esoteric Cundī form of Avalokiteśvara with eighteen arms in Lingyin Temple in Hangzhou, Zhejiang Province, China

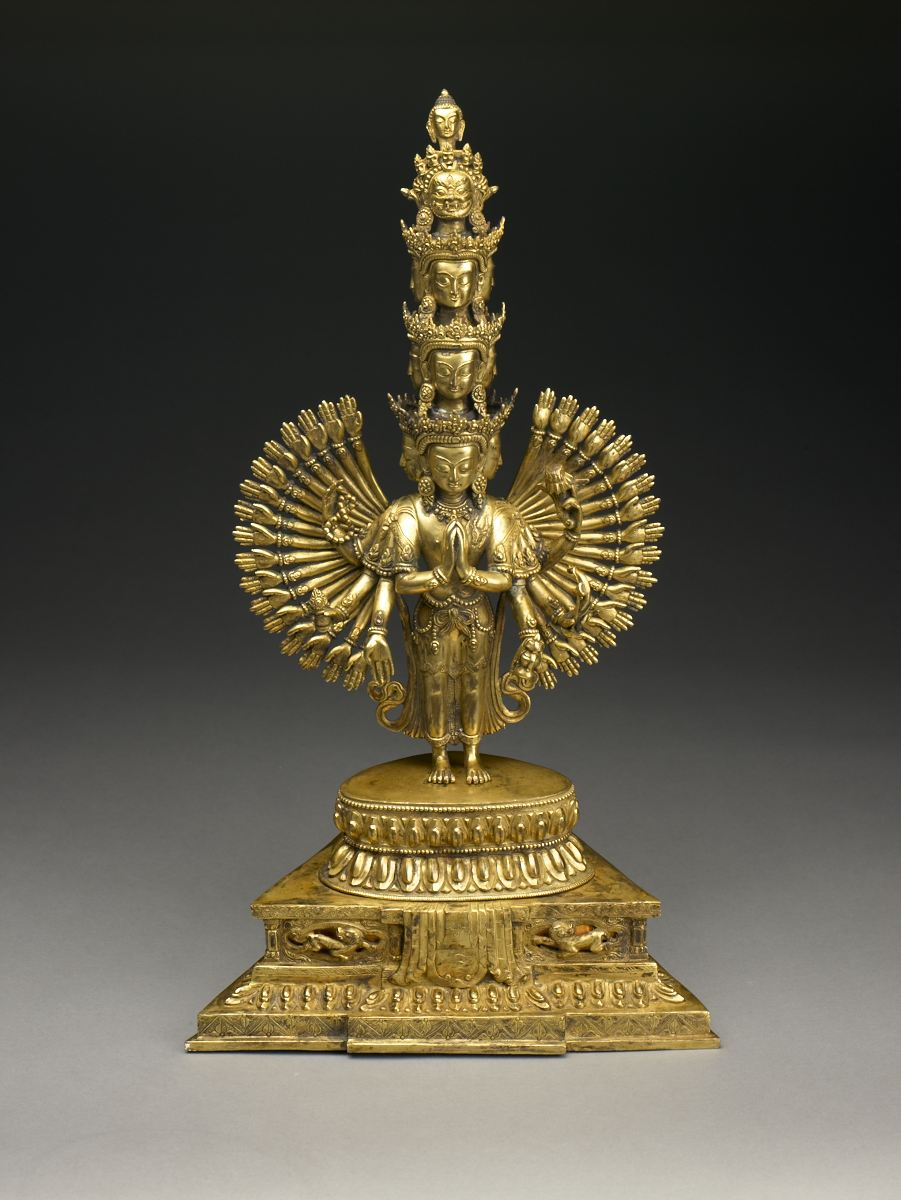
Thousand-armed Avalokiteśvara bronze statue from Tibet, circa 1750. Birmingham Museum of Art.

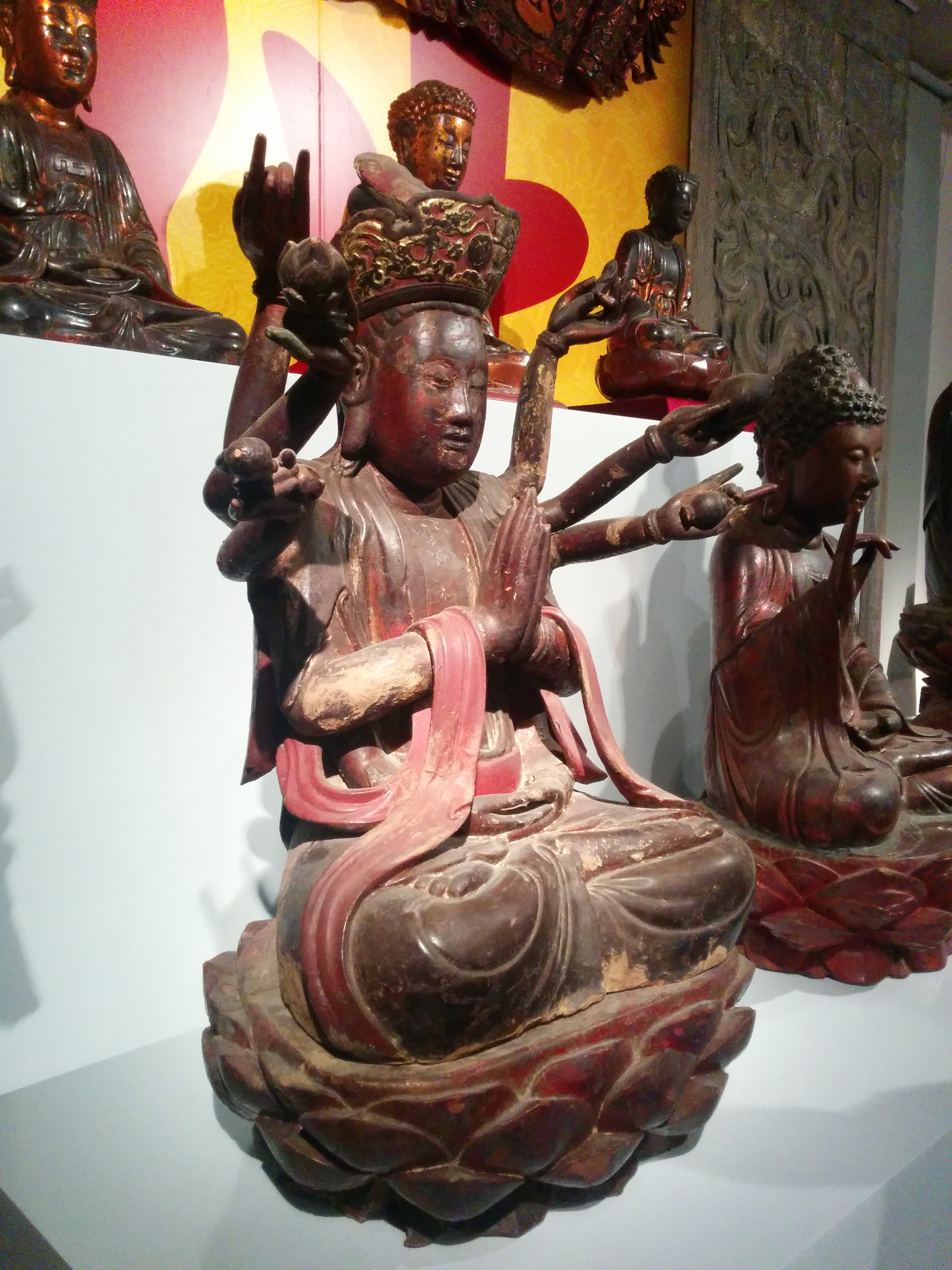
Quan Âm (Avalokiteśvara) statue in the 18th–19th centuries at the Vietnam National Museum of History, Hanoi, Vietnam

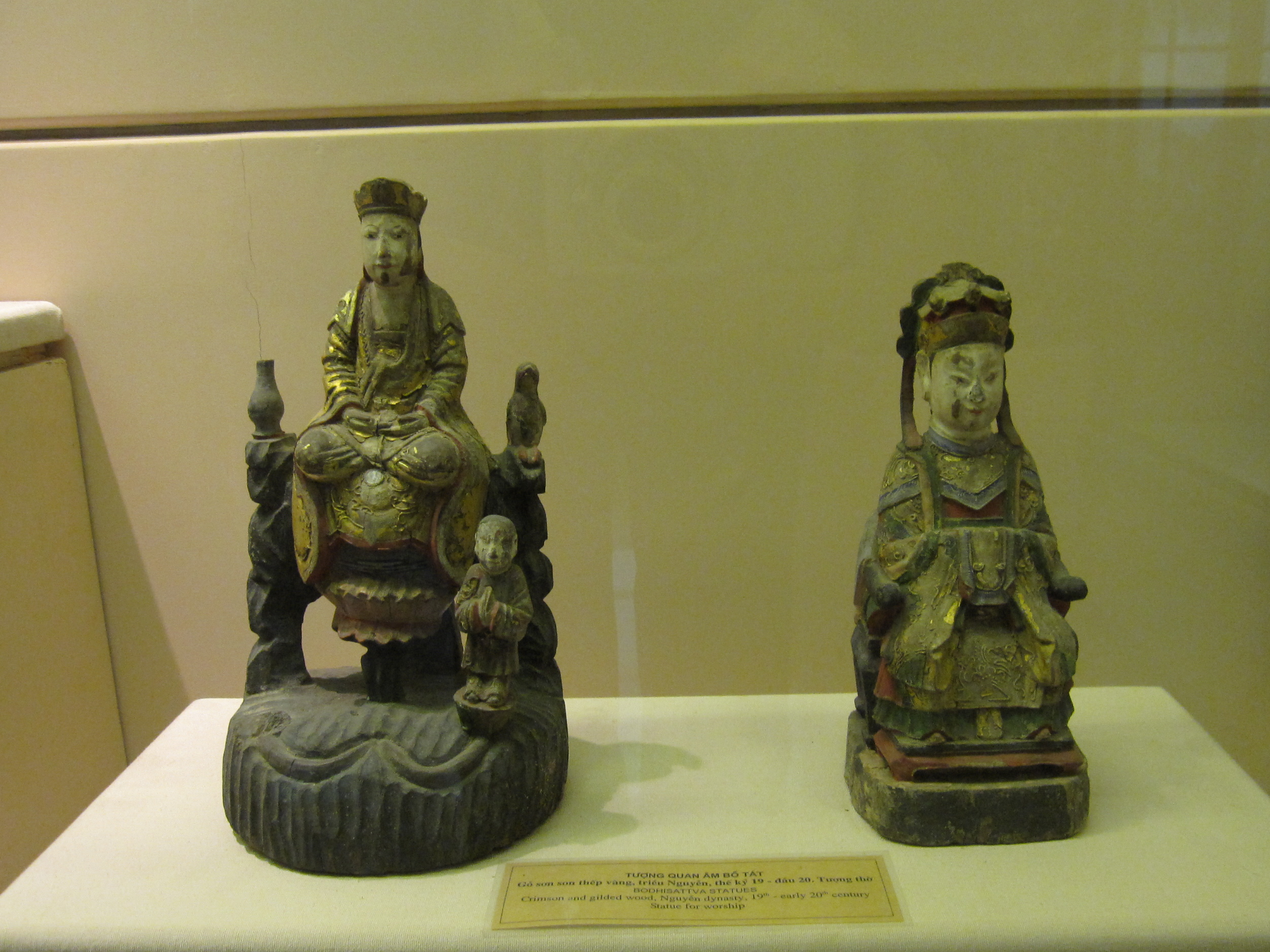
Two statues of Quan Âm (Avalokiteśvara) in the Nguyễn dynasty at the Vietnam National Museum of History, Vietnam

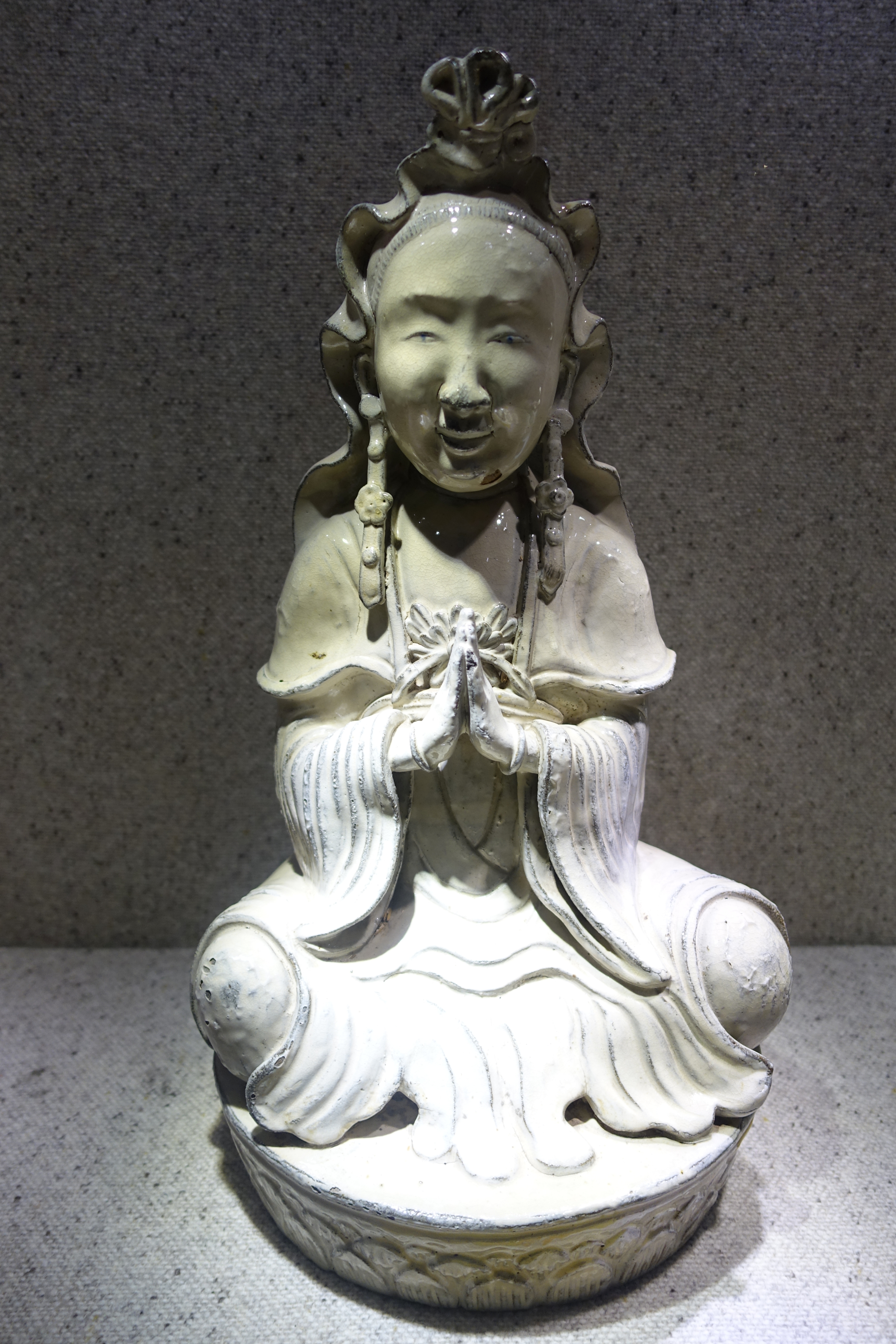
Quán Âm (Avalokiteśvara) figurine, Bát Tràng kiln, Hanoi, Nguyễn dynasty, 19th century CE, white glazed ceramic - Vietnam National Museum of History, Vietnam

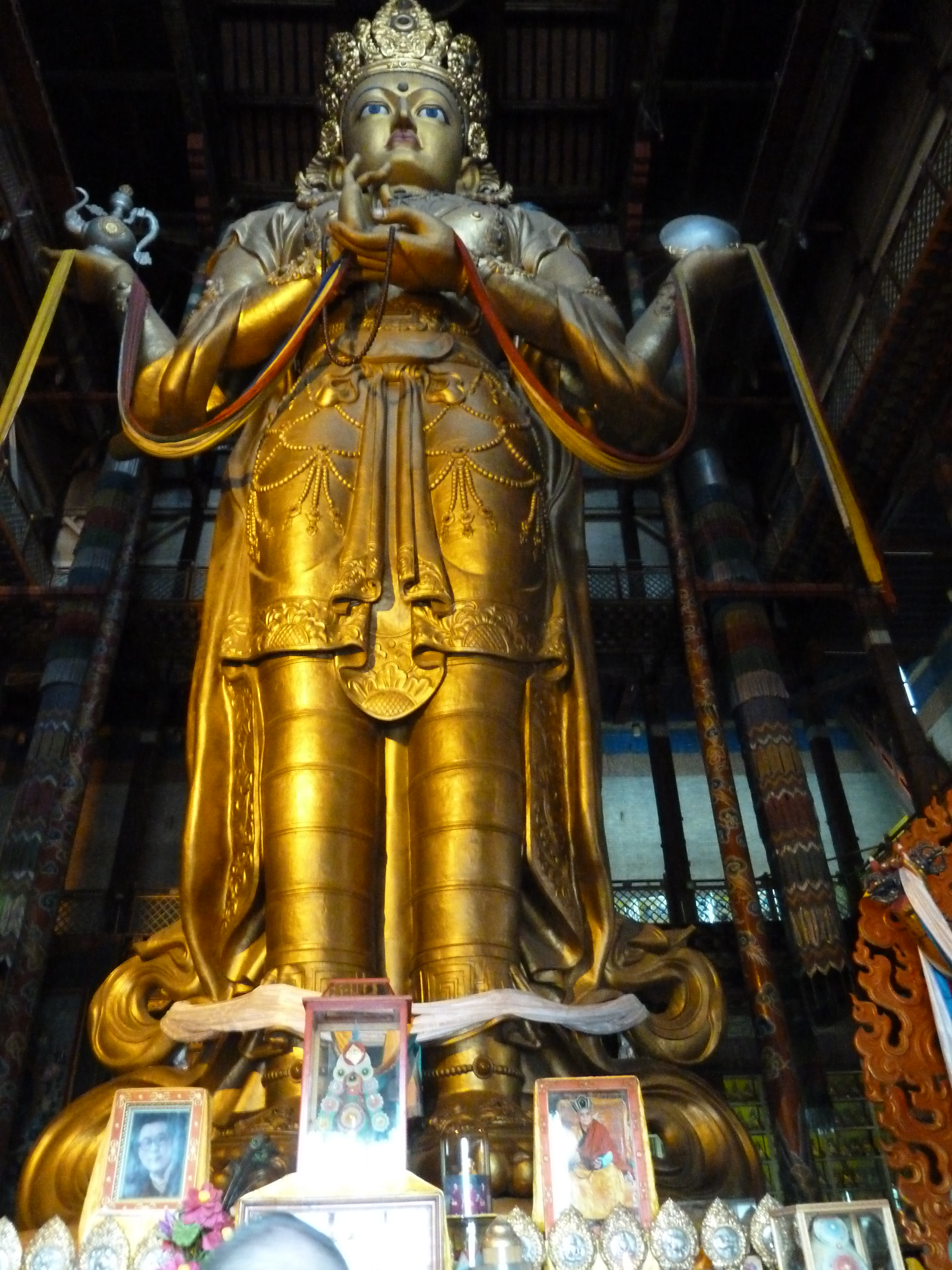
Statue of Avalokiteśvara (Migjid Janraisig) in Gandantegchinlen Monastery, Ulaanbaatar, Mongolia. The tallest indoor statue in the world, 26.5-meter-high, 1996 rebuilt (1913)

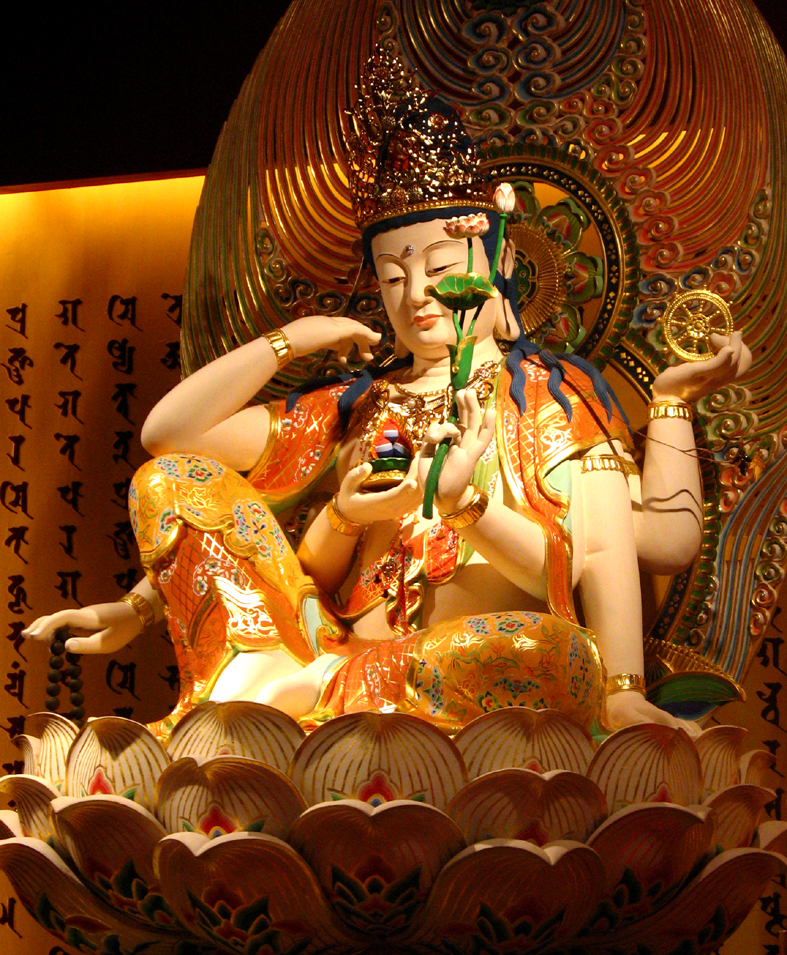
Statue of Ruyilun Guanyin (Cintamanicakra) in the Buddha Tooth Relic Temple and Museum in Chinatown, Singapore

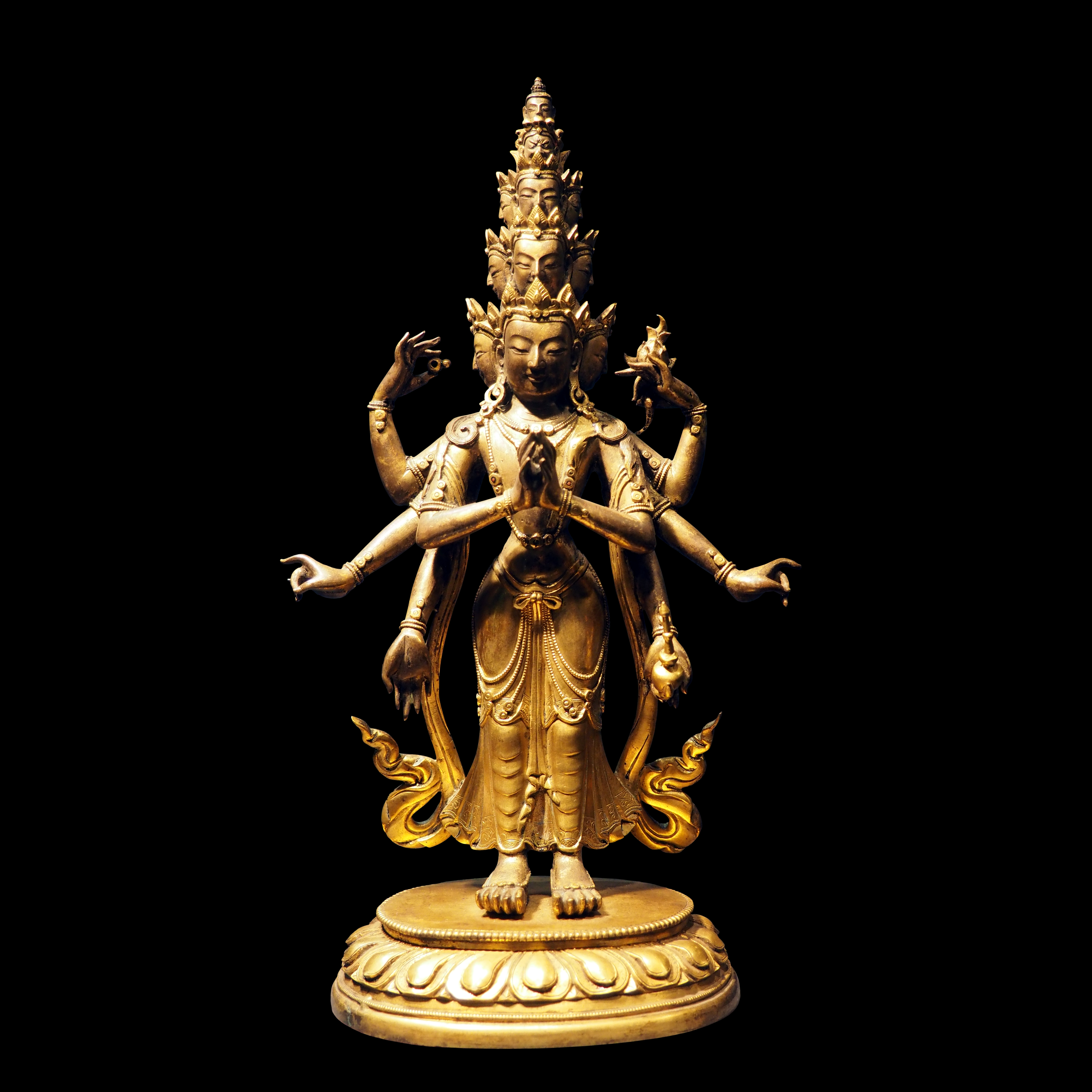
Statue of Avalokiteśvara, date unknown, bronze and gold

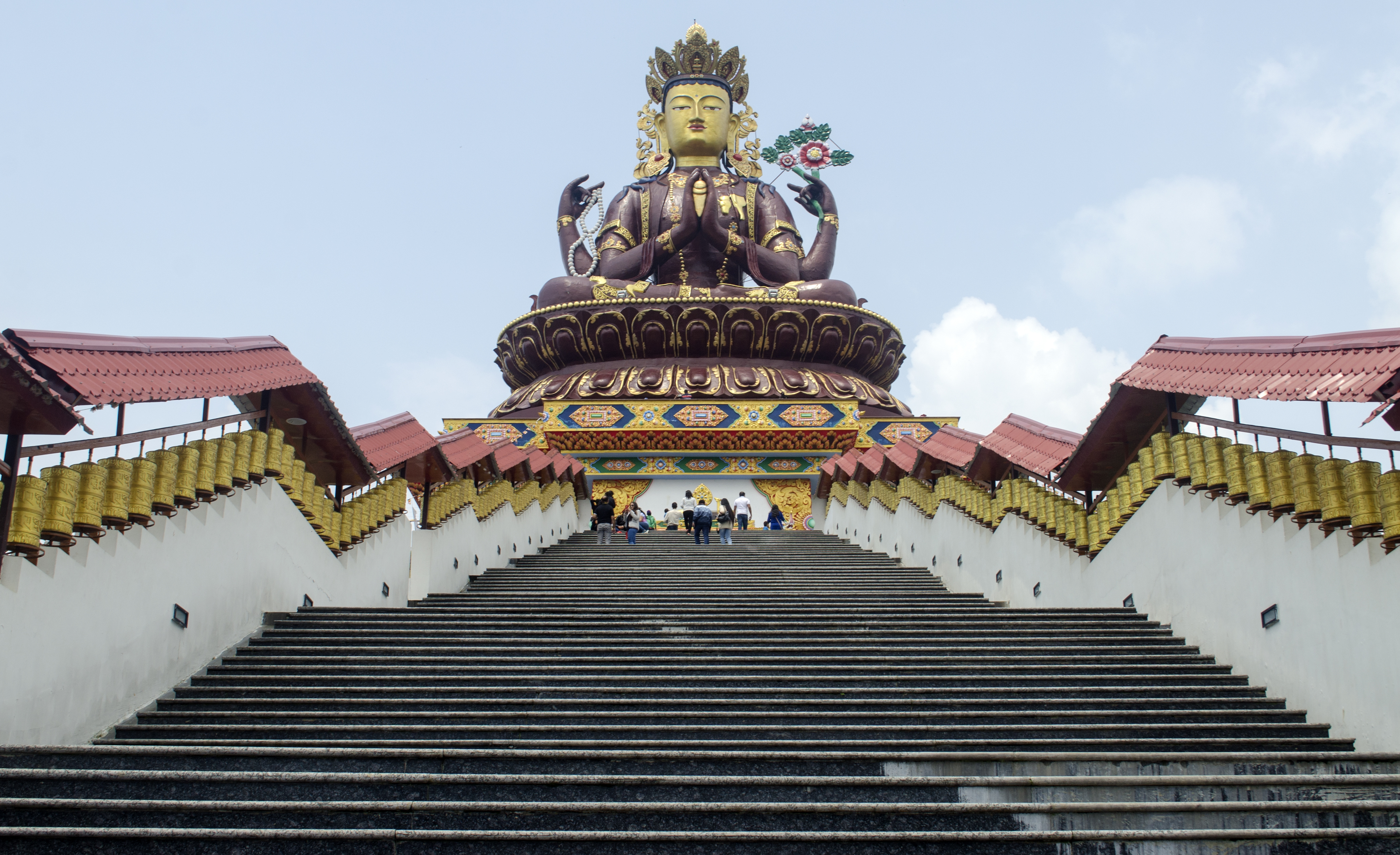
Statue of Chenrezig, Pelling, Sikkim, India

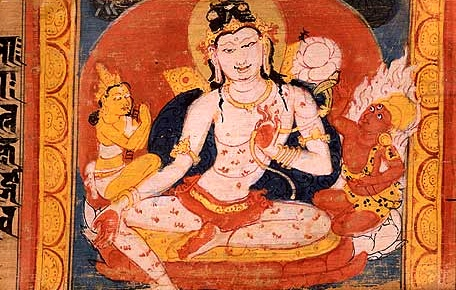
Painting of Avalokitesvara Bodhisattva. Sanskrit Astasahasrika Prajnaparamita Sutra manuscript written in the Ranjana script. Nalanda, Bihar, India. Circa 700–1100 CE

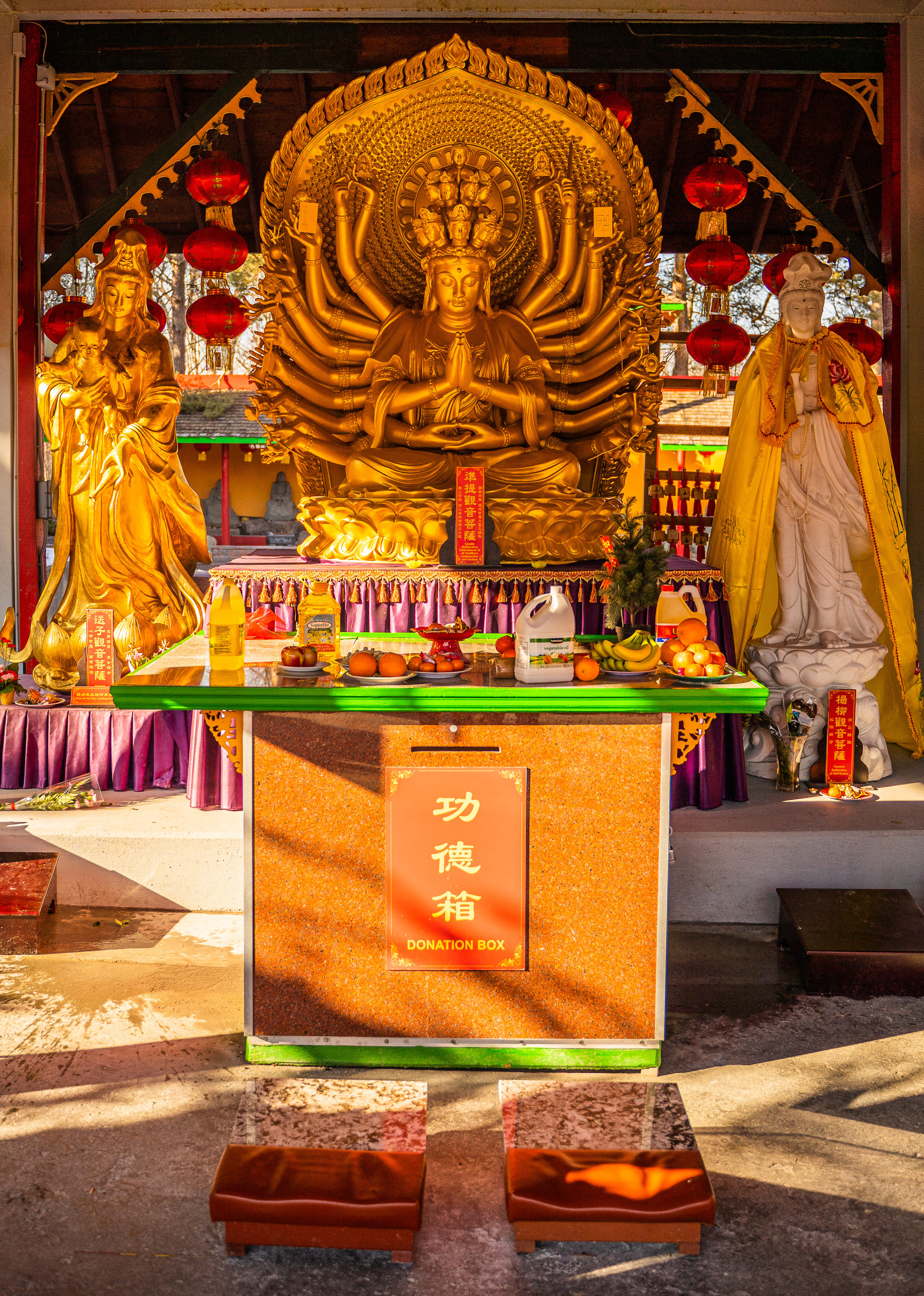
Qianshou Guanyin at Cham Shan Temple in Hong Kong, China

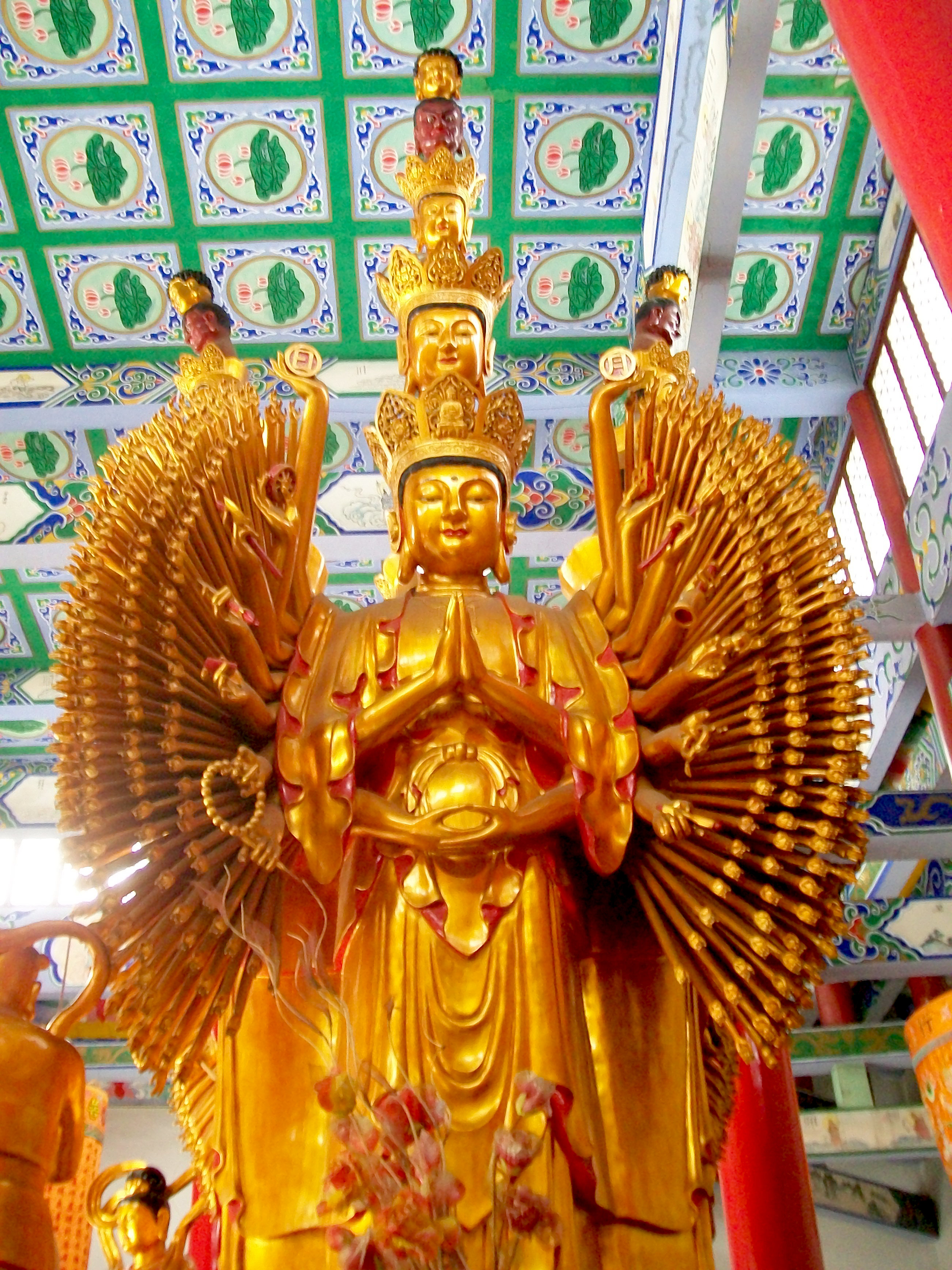
Qianshou Guanyin. Guanyin women's vihara, Anhui, China

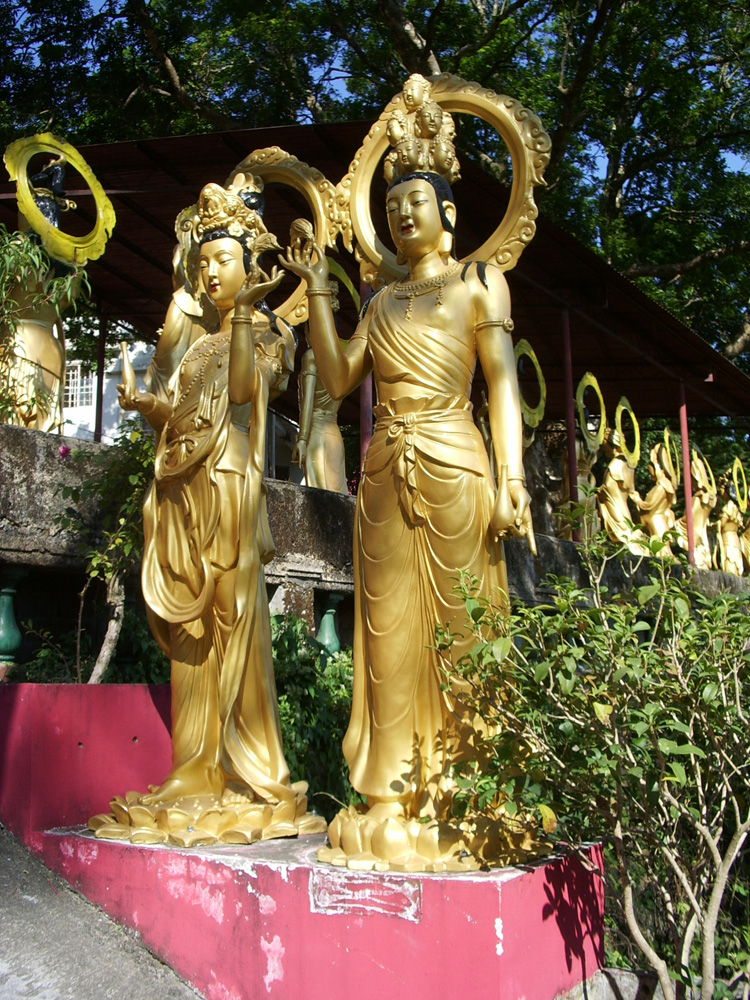
Statue of Shiyimian Guanyin in Ten Thousand Buddhas Monastery (萬佛寺) in Pai Tau Village, Sha Tin, Hong Kong

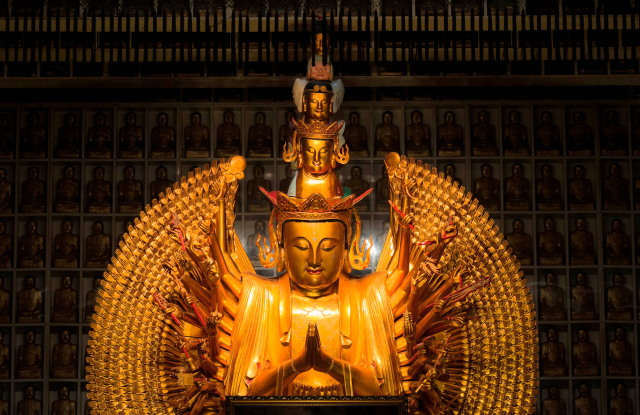
The wooden statue of thousand-armed and thousand-eyed Guanyin at the City of Ten Thousand Buddhas in Ukiah, California

== See also ==
- Virupaksha Temple, Hampi
- Guanyin
- Ishvara
- Pure Land Buddhism
- Ushnishasitatapattra
- Vishnu
- Dalai Lama
- Pha Trelgen Changchup Sempa

== Sources ==
- Buswell, Robert; Lopez, Donald S. (2013). The Princeton Dictionary of Buddhism. Princeton University Press. ISBN 978-0-691-15786-3.
- Doniger, Wendy, ed. (1993), Purana Perennis: Reciprocity and Transformation in Hindu and Jaina Texts, State University of New York Press, ISBN 0-7914-1381-0
- Ducor, Jérôme (2010). Le regard de Kannon (in French). Gollion: Infolio éditions / Genève: Musée d'ethnographie de Genève. p. 104. ISBN 978-2-88474-187-3. ill. colour
- Getty, Alice (1914). The gods of northern Buddhism: their history, iconography and progressive evolution through the northern Buddhist countries. Oxford: Clarendon Press.
- Holt, John (1991). Buddha in the Crown: Avalokitesvara in the Buddhist Traditions of Sri Lanka. New York: Oxford University Press. ISBN 0195064186.
- McDermott, James P. (1999). "Buddha in the Crown: Avalokitesvara in the Buddhist Traditions of Sri Lanka". Journal of the American Oriental Society. 119 (1): 195–196. doi:10.2307/605604. JSTOR 605604.
- Studholme, Alexander (2002). The Origins of Om Manipadme Hum. Albany NY: State University of New York Press. ISBN 0-7914-5389-8.
- Tsugunari, Kubo; Akira (tr.), Yuyama (2007). The Lotus Sutra (PDF) (Revised 2nd ed.). Berkeley, Calif.: Numata Center for Buddhist Translation and Research. ISBN 978-1-886439-39-9. Archived from the original (PDF) on 2015-07-02.
- Yü, Chün-fang (2001). Kuan-Yin: The Chinese Transformation of Avalokitesvara. Columbia University Press. ISBN 978-0-231-12029-6.
